Vilnius (previously known in English as Vilna, see also other names) is the capital and largest city of Lithuania, with a population of 625,349 (according to the state register) or 630,885 (according to the municipality of Vilnius) . The population of Vilnius's functional urban area, which stretches beyond the city limits, is estimated at 718,507 (as of 2020), while according to the Vilnius territorial health insurance fund, there were 753,875 permanent inhabitants as of November 2022 in Vilnius city and Vilnius district municipalities combined. Vilnius is situated in southeastern Lithuania and is currently the largest city in the Baltic states. It is the seat of Lithuania's national government and the Vilnius District Municipality.

Vilnius is known, among other things, for the architecture of its Old Town, one of the largest and best preserved old towns in Northern, Eastern, and Central Europe, declared a UNESCO World Heritage Site in 1994. Architectural style Vilnian Baroque is named after the city, which is the largest Baroque city north of the Alps, and the farthest one to the east.

The city was noted for its multicultural population already in the time of the Polish–Lithuanian Commonwealth, with contemporary sources comparing it to Babylon. Before World War II and the Holocaust, Vilnius was one of the most important Jewish centres in Europe. Its Jewish influence has led to its nickname "the Jerusalem of Lithuania". Napoleon called it "the Jerusalem of the North" as he was passing through in 1812.

In 2009, Vilnius was the European Capital of Culture, together with Linz, Austria. In 2021, Vilnius was named among top-25 fDi's Global Cities of the Future – one of the most forward-thinking cities with the greatest potential in the world.

Etymology and other names
The name of the city originates from the Vilnia River, from the Lithuanian for ripple. The city has also had many derivative spellings in various languages throughout its history: Vilna was once common in English. The most notable non-Lithuanian names for the city include ,  (Vilnia),  (Vilno),  (Vilne). A Russian name from the time of the Russian Empire was Вильна (Vilna), although Вильнюс (Vilnyus) is now used. The names Wilno, Wilna and Vilna were also used in older English-, German-, French- and Italian-language publications when the city was one of the capitals of the Polish–Lithuanian Commonwealth and an important city in the Second Polish Republic. Wilna is still used in German, along with Vilnius.

The neighborhoods of Vilnius also have names in other languages, which represent the languages spoken by various ethnic groups in the area.

According to legend, Grand Duke Gediminas (c. 1275–1341) was hunting in the sacred forest near the Valley of Šventaragis, near where the Vilnia River flows into the Neris River. Tired after the successful hunt of a wisent, the Grand Duke settled in for the night. He fell soundly asleep and dreamed of a huge Iron Wolf standing on top a hill and howling as strong and loud as a hundred wolves. Upon awakening, the Duke asked the krivis (pagan priest) Lizdeika to interpret the dream. The priest told him:
"What is destined for the ruler and the State of Lithuania, is thus: the Iron Wolf represents a castle and a city which will be established by you on this site. This city will be the capital of the Lithuanian lands and the dwelling of their rulers, and the glory of their deeds shall echo throughout the world."
Therefore, Gediminas, obeying the will of the gods, built the city, and gave it the name Vilnius, from the Vilnia River.

History

Early history and Grand Duchy of Lithuania

Historian Romas Batūra identifies the city with Voruta, one of the castles of Mindaugas, who was King of Lithuania after coronation in 1253. During the reign of Grand Dukes Butvydas and Vytenis, a city started emerging from a trading settlement and the first Franciscan Catholic church was built.

Vilnius is the historic and present-day capital of Lithuania. Archeological findings indicate that this city was the capital of the Kingdom of Lithuania and later that of the Grand Duchy of Lithuania. After Lithuania formed a dual confederation with the Kingdom of Poland, Vilnius still remained as Lithuania's capital.

The city was first mentioned in written sources in 1323 as Vilna, when the Letters of Grand Duke Gediminas were sent to German cities inviting Germans (including German Jews) to settle in the capital city, as well as to Pope John XXII. These letters contain the first unambiguous reference to Vilnius as the capital; Old Trakai Castle had been the earlier seat of the court of the Grand Duchy of Lithuania.

Vilnius's location offered practical advantages: it lay in the Lithuanian heartland at the confluence of two navigable rivers (Vilnia and Neris), surrounded by impenetrable forests and wetlands.

At the time of the 14th century, Lithuania was continuously invaded by the Teutonic Order. The future King of England Henry IV (then Henry Bolingbroke) spent a full year of 1390 supporting the unsuccessful siege of Vilnius by Teutonic Knights with his 300 fellow knights. During this campaign he bought captured Lithuanian women and children and took them back to Königsberg for their conversion to Christianity. King Henry's second expedition to Lithuania in 1392 illustrates the financial benefits of these guest crusaders to the Order. His small army consisted of over 100 men, including longbow archers and six minstrels, at a total cost to the Lancastrian purse of £4,360. Despite the efforts of Bolingbroke and his English crusaders, two years of attacks on Vilnius proved fruitless. Vilnius was the flourishing capital of the Grand Duchy of Lithuania, the residence of the Grand Duke. Gediminas expanded the Grand Duchy through warfare along with strategic alliances and marriages.

At its height it covered the territory of modern-day Lithuania, Belarus, Ukraine, Transnistria, and portions of modern-day Poland and Russia. His grandchildren Vytautas the Great and Jogaila, however, fought civil wars. During the Lithuanian Civil War of 1389–1392, Vytautas besieged and razed the city in an attempt to wrest control from Jogaila. The two Gediminids cousins later settled their differences; after a series of treaties culminating in the 1569 Union of Lublin, the Polish–Lithuanian Commonwealth was formed. The Commonwealth's rulers held two titles: Grand Duke of Lithuania and King of Poland. In 1387, Jogaila acting as a Grand Duke of Lithuania and King of Poland, granted Magdeburg rights to the city.

The Lithuanian monarchs were being inaugurated in the Vilnius Cathedral until 1569 by placing the Gediminas' Cap on their heads.

The city underwent a period of expansion in the 16th century. The Wall of Vilnius was built for protection between 1503 and 1522, comprising nine city gates and three towers. In 1547 Sigismund II Augustus moved his royal court from Kraków to Vilnius and it had a great influence on the intellectual life of the region. In 1548 Sigismund II finished the Renaissance style reconstruction of the Palace of the Grand Dukes of Lithuania which was started by his father, Sigismund I.

Polish–Lithuanian Commonwealth

Vilnius's growth was due in part to the establishment of Alma Academia et Universitas Vilnensis Societatis Iesu by the Polish King and Grand Duke of Lithuania Stephen Báthory in 1579. The university soon developed into one of the most important scientific and cultural centres in the region and the most notable scientific centre of the Commonwealth.

During its rapid development, the city was open to migrants from the territories of the Crown of the Kingdom of Poland, Grand Duchy and further. Many languages were spoken: Polish, German, Yiddish, Ruthenian, Lithuanian, Russian, Old Church Slavonic, Latin, Hebrew, and Turkic languages; the city was compared to Babylon. Each group contributed uniquely to the city's life, and crafts, trade, and science prospered.

The 17th century brought a number of setbacks. The Commonwealth was involved in a series of wars, collectively known as The Deluge. During the Thirteen Years' War (1654–1667), Vilnius was occupied by Muscovite forces; it was pillaged and burned, and its population massacred. During the Great Northern War it was looted by the Swedish army. An outbreak of bubonic plague in 1710 killed about 35,000 residents; devastating fires occurred in 1715, 1737, 1741, 1748, and 1749.

The city's growth lost its momentum for many years, but even despite this fact, at the end of the 18th century and before the Napoleon wars, Vilnius, with 56,000 inhabitants, entered the Russian Empire as its third-largest city.

In the Russian Empire
The fortunes of the Commonwealth declined during the 18th century. Three partitions took place, dividing its territory among the Russian Empire, the Habsburg Empire, and the Kingdom of Prussia. Forces led by Jakub Jasiński expelled Russians from Vilnius during the uprising in 1794. However, after the third partition of April 1795, Vilnius was annexed by the Russian Empire and in 1797–1801 was centre of the short-lived Lithuania Governorate, but since 1801 it become centre of the Vilna Governorate. During Russian rule, the city walls were destroyed, and by 1805 only the Gate of Dawn remained.

In 1807–1812 considerations took place and inhabitants of Vilnius and Lithuania expected Tsar Alexander I to grant them autonomy following the restoration of the Grand Duchy of Lithuania, which would have been subordinate to the tsar and a counterpoise for the Duchy of Warsaw, but the Grand Duchy of Lithuania was not restored as autonomous subject.

In 1812, the city was taken by Napoleon on his push towards Moscow, and again during the disastrous retreat. Initially, the Grande Armée and Napoleon were welcomed in Vilnius as liberators with locals aspirations of restoring the Grand Duchy of Lithuania. In response Napoleon established the Lithuanian Provisional Governing Commission. Thousands of soldiers died in the city during the eventual retreat; the mass graves were uncovered in 2002.

In 1814, the Congress of Vienna began which resulted in considerations to attach the Northwestern Krai (which included Vilnius) to Congress Poland, but it was not realized. Soon the activity of Philomaths and Filarets and their trial resulted in tightened control over the region's culture and intensified Russification.

Following the November Uprising in 1831, Vilnius University was closed and Russian repressions halted the further development of the city. Civil unrest in 1861 was suppressed by the Imperial Russian Army.

During the January Uprising in 1863, heavy fighting occurred within the city, but was brutally pacified by Mikhail Muravyov, nicknamed The Hangman by the population because of the many executions he organized. After the uprising, all civil liberties were withdrawn, and use of the Polish and Lithuanian languages was banned. Vilnius had a vibrant Jewish population: according to the Russian census of 1897, out of the total population of 154,500, Jews constituted 64,000 (approximately 40%). During the early 20th century, the Lithuanian-speaking population of Vilnius constituted only a small minority, with Polish, Yiddish, and Russian speakers comprising the majority of the city's population.  On 4–5 December 1905, the Great Seimas of Vilnius was held in the current Lithuanian National Philharmonic Society building with over 2000 participants. It was the first modern national congress in Lithuania. The assembly decided to demand wide political autonomy within the Russian Empire and achieve this by peaceful means. It is considered an important step towards the Act of Independence of Lithuania, adopted on 16 February 1918 by the Council of Lithuania, as the Seimas laid the groundwork for the establishment of an independent Lithuanian state.

World War I
During World War I, Vilnius and the rest of Lithuania was occupied by the German Army from 1915 until 1918. The Act of Independence of Lithuania, which declared Lithuanian independence without any affiliation to any other nation, was issued in the city on 16 February 1918 with Vilnius as its capital.

Regional turmoil 1918–1920

At the end of 1918 Soviet Russia invaded Lithuania with massive forces, and the Lithuanian Army withdrew from Vilnius to the center of the country in order to form a defense line. The German Army withdrew together with the Lithuanian government. The Self-Defence of Lithuania, which was affiliated with the Second Polish Republic, briefly controlled the city and unsuccessfully tried protecting it against the invading Soviet forces. Vilnius changed hands again during the Polish–Soviet War and the Lithuanian Wars of Independence: it was taken by the Polish Army, only to fall to Soviet forces again. Shortly after the Red Army's defeat at the 1920 Battle of Warsaw, in order to delay the Polish advance, the Soviet government ceded the city to Lithuania after signing the Soviet–Lithuanian Peace Treaty on 12 July 1920.

The League of Nations became involved in the subsequent Lithuanian self defense from Poland after it attacked Lithuanian army positions in the south west of Lithuania. The League brokered the ceasefire called the Suwałki Agreement on 7 October 1920. Lithuanians believed that it stopped a Polish aggression. Although neither Vilnius or the surrounding region was explicitly addressed in the agreement, numerous historians have described the agreement as allotting Vilnius to Lithuania. On 9 October 1920, the Polish Army surreptitiously, under General Lucjan Żeligowski, seized Vilnius during an operation known as Żeligowski's Mutiny. The city and its surroundings were designated as a separate state, called the Republic of Central Lithuania.

Interwar Poland

On 20 February 1922, after the highly contested election in Central Lithuania, the entire area was annexed by Poland, with the city becoming the capital of the Wilno Voivodeship (Wilno being the name of Vilnius in Polish). Kaunas then became the temporary capital of Lithuania. Lithuania vigorously contested the Polish annexation of Vilnius, and refused diplomatic relations with Poland. The predominant languages of the city were still Polish and, to a lesser extent, Yiddish. The Lithuanian-speaking population at the time was a small minority, at about 6% of the city's population according even to contemporary Lithuanian sources. The Council of Ambassadors and the international community (with the exception of Lithuania) recognized Polish sovereignty over Vilnius Region in 1923.

Vilnius University was reopened in 1919 under the name of Stefan Batory University. By 1931, the city had 195,000 inhabitants, making it the fifth largest city in Poland with varied industries, such as Elektrit, a factory that produced radio receivers.

World War II

Nazi Germany had invited Lithuania to join the invasion of Poland and retake the historical capital Vilnius by force; however, President Antanas Smetona and most of the Lithuanian politicians declined this offer because they had doubts about Adolf Hitler's eventual victory and were outraged by the 1939 German ultimatum to Lithuania. Instead, they supported the neutrality policy and after being encouraged by the French and British diplomats – Lithuania adopted the Neutrality Act, which was supported by all the political forces.

World War II began with the German invasion of Poland in September 1939. The secret protocols of the Molotov–Ribbentrop Pact had partitioned Lithuania and Poland into German and Soviet spheres of interest. On 19 September 1939, Vilnius was seized by the Soviet Union (which invaded Poland on 17 September). The Soviets repressed the local population and devastated the city, moving assets and factories to the USSR territory, including the major Polish radio factory Elektrit, along with a part of its labor force, to Minsk in Belarus SSR. The Soviets and Lithuania concluded a mutual assistance treaty on 10 October 1939, with which the Lithuanian government accepted the presence of Soviet military bases in various parts of the country. On 28 October 1939, the Red Army withdrew from the city to its suburbs (to Naujoji Vilnia) and Vilnius was given over to Lithuania. A Lithuanian Army parade took place on 29 October 1939 through the city center. The Lithuanians immediately attempted to re-Lithuanize the city, for example by Lithuanizing Polish schools.

Following the normalisation of relation with Poland the Lithuanian Consulate was opened in Vilnius on 22 August 1939, but the consul started operating there only after the war already began, on 9 September 1939.

The whole of Lithuania was annexed by the Soviet Union on 3 August 1940 following a June ultimatum from the Soviets demanding, among other things, that unspecified numbers of Red Army soldiers be allowed to enter the country for the purpose of helping to form a more pro-Soviet government. After the ultimatum was issued and Lithuania further occupied, a Soviet government was installed with Vilnius as the capital of the newly created Lithuanian SSR. Between 20,000 and 30,000 of the city's inhabitants were subsequently arrested by the NKVD and sent to gulags in the far eastern areas of the Soviet Union.

On 22 June 1941, the Germans launched Operation Barbarossa against the Soviet Union, while at the same time Lithuanians began the anti-Soviet June Uprising, organized by the Lithuanian Activist Front. Lithuanians proclaimed independence and organized the Provisional Government of Lithuania. This government quickly self-disbanded. Nazis captured Vilnius on 24 June 1941. Lithuania became part of the Reichskommissariat Ostland, German civil administration. Two ghettos were set up in the old town centre for the large Jewish population – the smaller one of which was "liquidated" by October. The larger ghetto lasted until 1943, though its population was regularly deported in roundups known as "Aktionen". A forced labour camp (Kailis) was also set up behind the Vilnius Town Hall as a factory to produce winter clothing for the Wehrmacht and another one later for vehicle repair (HKP 562) on 47 & 49 Subačiaus Street. A failed ghetto uprising on 1 September 1943 organized by the Fareinigte Partizaner Organizacje (the United Partisan Organization, the first Jewish partisan unit in German-occupied Europe), was followed by the final destruction of the ghetto.

Vilnius' situation in 1944 was tenuous. As the Eastern Front neared Lithuania, the Lithuanian Territorial Defense Force (LTDF) under general Plechavičius was founded in mid-February to fight the Red Army and Soviet partisans, both only within Lithuanian borders, but it was soon brutally disbanded in mid-April by the Germans due to German-Lithuanian friction. As Armia Krajowa (AK) operated within the borders of interwar Poland, which overlapped with the Lithuanian lands, this caused clashes between both organisations. In early July, Operation Ostra Brama was a failed attempt of the AK to take the city from the Wehrmacht before the approaching Red Army. As the Polish army did not take over the city, the speed of the Soviet Vilnius offensive led to a joint Polish-Soviet effort to seize Vilnius. After the battle, the Polish army was dispersed, some of it incorporated into the Soviet-loyal Polish People's Army, while the officers were arrested and imprisoned.

Soviet occupation

In July 1944, Vilnius was once more occupied by Soviet Army with the Vilnius offensive, during which it defeated the German garrison. The town was once more the Lithuanian SSR's capital. The NKVD began repressions against Lithuanians and Poles. Sovietization began in earnest.

The war had irreversibly altered the city – between 1939 and 1949, Vilnius lost almost 90% of its population, through murder, deportation or exile, many buildings were destroyed. The Jewish population had been exterminated in the Holocaust, while most of the remaining ones were compelled to move to Communist Poland by 1946. Some partisans and members of the intelligentsia hiding in the forest were now targeted and deported to Siberia after the war.

From the late 1940s on Vilnius began to grow again, following an influx of Lithuanians, Poles and Belarusians from neighbouring regions and throughout Lithuania as well as neighbouring region of Grodno and from other more remote areas of the Soviet Union (particularly Russia, Belarus and Ukraine). Most of these new residents moved to Vilnius, due to repressions or poor living conditions caused by, e.g. collectivisation, in areas, where they lived previously. On the previously rural outskirts as well as in the very vicinity of the Old Town (industrial zones in Paupys, Markučiai, Naujamiestis), industrial areas were (re)designed and large Soviet plants were built, following a program of industrialization.

In November 1980, the number of inhabitants of Vilnius exceeded 500,000. Because of shortage of housing for a growing population of the city, large scale Microdistricts (so-called sleeping districts) were built in the elderates of Antakalnis, Žirmūnai, Lazdynai, Karoliniškės, Viršuliškės, Baltupiai, Šeškinė, Justiniškės, Pašilaičiai, Fabijoniškės and on a smaller scale in other parts of Vilnius. These were connected with the central part as well as with industrial areas via expressway-like streets (so-called fast traffic streets) and by public transport, noticeably extensive network of trolleybuses (from 1956).

Independent Lithuania

On 11 March 1990, the Supreme Council of the Lithuanian SSR announced its secession from the Soviet Union and intention to restore an independent Republic of Lithuania. As a result of these declarations, on 9 January 1991, the Soviet Union sent in troops. This culminated in the 13 January attack on the State Radio and Television Building and the Vilnius TV Tower, killing at least fourteen civilians and seriously injuring 700 more. The Soviet Union finally recognised Lithuanian independence in September 1991. The Constitution, as did the earlier Lithuanian Constitution of 1922, mentions that "the capital of the State of Lithuania shall be the city of Vilnius, the long-standing historical capital of Lithuania".

Vilnius has been rapidly transforming, emerging as a modern European city. The majority of its historical buildings during the last 25 years had been renovated, and a business and commercial area is being developed into the New City Centre, that is expected to become the city's main administrative and business district on the north side of the Neris river. This area includes modern residential and retail space, with the municipality building and the  Europa Tower as its most prominent buildings. The construction of Swedbank's headquarters is symbolic of the importance of Scandinavian banks in Vilnius. The building complex Vilnius Business Harbour was built in 2008, and one of its towers is now the 6th tallest building in Lithuania. More buildings are scheduled for construction in the area.
More than 75,000 new flats were built between 1995 and 2018 (including almost 50,000 new flats between 2003 and 2018), making Vilnius an absolute leader in construction sector in the Baltics of the last two decades. On average,  or 3,246 flats are built each year. In 2015, there were 225,871 units in multi-storey houses and 20,578 flats in single-family or duplex apartment houses, the share of such housing increasing from 6.9% in 2006 to 8.3% in 2015. The record numbers of flats were built in 2019 – 4,322 flats in multi-family residentials were built in Vilnius city municipality and 817 flats were built in Vilnius urban zone (the city and the closest surroundings) in single-family detached houses – the later being the highest number in history.

Vilnius was selected as a 2009 European Capital of Culture, along with Linz, the capital of Upper Austria. Its 2009 New Year's Eve celebration, marking the event, featured a light show said to be "visible from outer space". In preparation, the historical centre of the city was restored, and its main monuments were renovated.

The global economic crisis of 2007–2008 led to a drop in tourism which prevented many of the projects from reaching their planned extent, and allegations of corruption and incompetence were made against the organisers, while tax increases for cultural activity led to public protests and the general economic conditions sparked riots. In 2015 Remigijus Šimašius became the first directly elected mayor of the city.

On 28–29 November 2013, Vilnius hosted the Eastern Partnership Summit in the Palace of the Grand Dukes of Lithuania. Many European presidents, prime ministers and other high-ranking officials participated in the event. On 29 November 2013, Georgia and Moldova signed association and free trade agreements with the European Union. Previously, Ukraine and Armenia were also expected to sign the agreements but postponed the decision, sparking large protests in Ukraine.

The 2023 NATO summit will be held in Vilnius.

Geography

Vilnius is situated in southeastern Lithuania at the confluence of the Vilnia and Neris rivers.

Several countries claim that the geographical centre of Europe is located in their territories. Its location depends on which arbitrary definition of the extent of Europe is chosen; the Guinness Book of World Records recognises a point near Vilnius as the continent's centre. The method used for calculating this point was that of the centre of gravity of the geometrical figure of Europe. This point is located in Lithuania, near the village of Girija (26 kilometres from Vilnius). A monument, composed by the sculptor Gediminas Jokūbonis and consisting of a column of white granite surmounted by a crown of stars, was erected at the location in 2004.

Vilnius is connected by highways to other major Lithuanian cities, such as Kaunas ( away), Šiauliai ( away) and Panevėžys ( away).

Buildings occupy 29.1% of the city; green spaces occupy 68.8%; and waters occupy 2.1%.

Nature reserves
Vilnius has eight protected nature reserves: Vokės Senslėnio Slopes Geomorphological Reserve, Aukštagiris Geomorphological Reserve, Valakupių Klonio Geomorphological Reserve, Veržuva Hydrographic Reserve, Vokė Hydrographic Reserve, Cedronas Upstream Landscape Reserve, Tapeliai Landscape Reserve and Šeškinė Slopes Geomorphological Reserve.

Climate

The climate of Vilnius is humid continental (Köppen climate classification Dfb). Temperature records have been kept since 1777. Average annual temperatures in the city have increased significantly during the last 30 years, a change which the Lithuanian Hydrometeorological Service attributes to global warming induced by human activities.

Summer days are warm and sometimes hot, especially in July and August, with temperatures above  throughout the day during periodic heat waves. Outdoor bars, restaurants and cafés are widely frequented during the daytime.

Winters can be very cold, with temperatures rarely reaching above freezing – temperatures below  may occur in January and February. Vilnius's rivers freeze over in particularly cold winters, and the lakes surrounding the city are almost always permanently frozen during this time of year. A popular pastime is ice-fishing.

The Lithuanian Hydrometeorological Service is headquartered in Vilnius and monitors climate of Vilnius and Lithuania.

Culture

Painting and sculpture

For centuries, Vilnius as a capital city was an art centre of the Grand Duchy of Lithuania and has attracted artists from all across Europe. The oldest works of art which remained from the early Gothic period (14th century) are paintings dedicated to churches and liturgy (e.g. frescoes in the Crypts of Vilnius Cathedral, decorated hymns books). Walls paintings from the 16th centuries were also discovered in Vilnius (e.g. painting of the Church of St. Francis and St. Bernard vaults or in the Church of Saint Nicholas). Gothic wooden, mostly polychrome sculptures were used to decorate the altars of the churches of Vilnius. Some Gothic seals from the 14–15th centuries remained until the nowadays (Kęstutis, Vytautas the Great, Sigismund II Augustus).

In the early 16th century, the Renaissance sculptures appeared, which were mostly created by Italian sculptors: Bernardinus Zanobi da Gianotti, Giovani Cini, Giovanni Maria Padovano. In the Renaissance period, portrait tombstones and medals were highly valued (e.g. marle tomb of Albertas Goštautas, 1548, by B. Z. da Gianotti, tomb of Povilas Alšėniškis, 1555, by G. Cini, both located in the Vilnius Cathedral). The works of Italian sculptors are characterized by a naturalistic treatment of forms, precise proportions, tectonicity, a realistic representation of the deceased. The local sculptors took over only the iconographic scheme of the Renaissance tomb; their works (e.g. tomb of Lew Sapieha, ca. 1633, at Church of St. Michael) are characterized by conditionality of forms, stylization. During this period local and Western European painters created religious, mythologic compositions, portraits, which were intertwined with late Gothic and Baroque features. Illustrated prayer books illustrations and miniatures have survived.

The Baroque period which began in the late 16th century was exceptional for Vilnius as wall painting blossomed in the city. Most of the palaces and churches were decorated with frescoes characterized by bright colors, sophisticated angles and dramatism style. Also during this period the secular painting spread – representational, imaginative, epitaph portraits, scenes of battles, politically important events. It is characterized by detailed realistic style. This period sculptures dominated in the sacred architecture (tombstones with sculptural portraits, exterior and interior decorative sculptures), made of wood, marble and stucco. Italian sculptors (e.g. G. P. Perti, G. M. Galli, A. S. Capone) were exceptionally important in the 17th century Grand Duchy's sculptures development and were invited there by the Lithuanian nobility. Their works are characterized by the features of mature baroque: expressiveness of forms, sensuality, atectonic composition (e.g. sculptural decor of the Church of St. Peter and St. Paul). The local sculptors emphasized the decorative features of the baroque, and the expressiveness and emotionality of the baroque was less characteristic in their works.

At the late 18th and 19th centuries, the Lithuanian painting was largely influenced by the Vilnius Art School which introduced manifestations of Classicism art and later of Romanticism art. The painters had internships abroad, mainly in Italy. Painting of allegorical, mythological compositions, landscapes, portraits of representatives of various circles of society was begun; historical themes prevailed. The most famous Classicism painters from this time are Franciszek Smaglewicz, Jan Rustem, Józef Oleszkiewicz, Józef Peszka, Wincenty Smokowski. While the Romanticism art is characterized by Jan Rustem, Jan Krzysztof Damel, Wincenty Dmochowski and Kanuty Rusiecki works. After the closure of Vilnius University in 1832, the artistic direction formed by the representatives of the Vilnius Art School influenced the further development of Lithuanian art.

Development of art in the first half of the 20th century was promoted by activities and exhibitions of the Lithuanian Art Society, established in 1907 by Petras Rimša, Antanas Žmuidzinavičius, Antanas Jaroševičius, and Vilnius Art Society, established in 1908. This period is characterized by Jonas Šileika, Vytautas Kairiūkštis, Vytautas Pranas Bičiūnas works. They continued the traditions of Western European styles (symbolism, realism, art nouveau) and followed the modernism art directions. Although, after the World War II the method of socialist realism was introduced – propaganda paintings, compositions of historical, household genre, still lifes, landscapes, portraits and sculptures.

The most notable late 20th and 21st centuries Vilnian painters are Žygimantas Augustinas, Eglė Ridikaitė, Eglė Gineitytė, Patricija Jurkšaitytė, Jurga Barilaitė, Solomonas Teitelbaumas.

Many prominent art galleries are located in Vilnius. Lithuania's largest art collection is housed in the Lithuanian Art Museum. One branch of it, the Vilnius Picture Gallery in the Vilnius Old Town, houses a collection of Lithuanian art from the 16th to the beginning of the 20th century. On the other side of the Neris, the National Art Gallery holds a permanent exhibition on Lithuanian 20th-century art, as well as numerous exhibitions on modern art. The Contemporary Art Centre is the largest venue for contemporary art in the Baltic States, with an exhibition space of 2400 square meters. The centre is a non-collection based institution committed to developing a broad range of international and Lithuanian exhibition projects as well as presenting a wide range of public programmes including lectures, seminars, performances, film and video screenings, and live new music events. On 10 November 2007, the Jonas Mekas Visual Arts Center was opened by avant-garde filmmaker Jonas Mekas with its premiere exhibition entitled The Avant-Garde: From Futurism to Fluxus. In 2018, the MO Museum was opened and is a personal initiative of Lithuanian scientists and philanthropists Danguolė and Viktoras Butkus. Its collection of 5000 modern and contemporary pieces contains major Lithuanian artworks from the 1950s to this day.

The Užupis district near the Old Town, which used to be one of the more run-down districts of Vilnius during the Soviet era, is home to a movement of bohemian artists, who operate numerous art galleries and workshops. Užupis declared itself an independent republic on April Fool's Day in 1997. In the main square, the statue of an angel blowing a trumpet stands as a symbol of artistic freedom.

In 1995, the world's first bronze cast of Frank Zappa was installed in the Naujamiestis district with the permission of the government. The Frank Zappa sculpture confirmed the newly found freedom of expression and marked the beginning of a new era for Lithuanian society.

In 2015, the project of Vilnius Talking Statues was realized. Eighteen statues around Vilnius interact with visitors in multiple languages by a telephone call to a smartphone.

Literature

About 1520, Francysk Skaryna, who is the author of the first Ruthenian Bible, established a printing house in Vilnius – the first in Eastern Europe. In 1522, he prepared and published the first printed book of the Grand Duchy of Lithuania, titled the Little Traveller's Book (Ruthenian language: Малая подорожная книжка). In 1525, he printed the Acts and Epistles of the Apostles (the Apostle).

The Vilnius Academy Press was established in 1575 by the Lithuanian noble Mikołaj Krzysztof "the Orphan" Radziwiłł as the printing house of the Vilnius Academy. He delegated the management of the printing house to the Jesuits. In May 1576, it published its first book Pro Sacratissima Eucharistia contra haeresim Zwinglianam by Piotr Skarga. The Vilnius Academy Press situation was exceptional because its activities were funded by the secular society, the Lithuanian nobility and the Church. In 1805, Józef Zawadzki bought the Vilnius Academy Press and founded the Józef Zawadzki printing shop which continuously worked until 1939 and published books in multiple languages. The first poetry book of Adam Mickiewicz was published there in 1822.

One of the creators of Lithuanian writing, Mikalojus Daukša, translated and published the Catechism by Spanish Jesuit theologist Jacobo Ledesma in 1595 – this was the first printed Lithuanian language book in the Grand Duchy of Lithuania. He also translated and published the Jakub Wujek's Postilla Catholica in 1599 (both in Vilnius).

Many famous writers were born, lived in Vilnius or are alumnus of the Vilnius University (e.g. Konstantinas Sirvydas, Maciej Kazimierz Sarbiewski, Antoni Gorecki, Józef Ignacy Kraszewski, Antoni Edward Odyniec, Michał Józef Römer, Adam Mickiewicz, Władysław Syrokomla, Józef Mackiewicz, Romain Gary, Juliusz Słowacki, Simonas Daukantas, Mykolas Biržiška, Petras Cvirka (who was killed in Vilnius by soviet secret police), Kazys Bradūnas, Nobel prize-winner Czesław Miłosz, Jurga Ivanauskaitė).

The first consideration of the First Statute of Lithuania took place in 1522 at the Seimas of the Grand Duchy of Lithuania in Vilnius. The Statute of Lithuania has been drafted under the guidance of Grand Chancellor of Lithuania Albertas Goštautas and in accordance with the courts' jurisprudence formed by customary law, Heads of State legislation on certain matters and by the provisions of the canon law and Roman law regulations. It is the first official codification of this kind of secular law in Europe.

Lithuanian nationalist Albertas Goštautas actively supported the Lithuanian language usage in the Lithuanian literature and protected Lithuanian authors, including Abraomas Kulvietis and Michael the Lithuanian, who criticised the usage of Old Slavonic church language and called refugees Old Believers as the Muscovian spies in his book De moribus tartarorum, lituanorum et moscorum.

Since the 16th century, the Lithuanian Metrica was kept at the Lower Castle and safeguarded by the State Chancellor. Due to the deterioration of the books, the State Grand Chancellor, Lew Sapieha, ordered the volumes of the Metrica to be recopied in 1594. The recopying process continued until 1607. The newly recopied books were inventoried, rechecked, and transferred to a separate building in Vilnius, with the older books remaining in the Castle of Vilnius. According to the 1983 data, 665 books have remained until the nowadays and their microfilms are preserved at the Lithuanian State Historical Archives in Vilnius.

Over 200 tiles and commemorative plaques to writers, who have lived and worked in Vilnius, and foreign authors, who have shared a connection with Vilnius and Lithuania, adorn walls on Literatų Street in the Old Town, presenting a broad overview of the history of Lithuanian literature.

The Institute of Lithuanian Literature and Folklore and the Lithuanian Writers' Union are located in Vilnius.

The biggest book fair in Baltic states is annually held in Vilnius at LITEXPO, the Baltic's biggest exhibition centre.

Cinema

The very first public film session in Vilnius was held in the Botanical Garden (now Bernardinai Garden) in the summer of 1897. It is notable that such an event was held in Vilnius soon after the very first film sessions in the world by Auguste and Louis Lumière, who held it in Paris in 1895. Vilnius film session also showed the Lumière brothers documentary movies. Firstly shown movies were educational and were filmed in exotic locations (e.g. India, Africa) and introduced different cultures to Vilnians, who enjoyed the movies because very few were able to visit such far places. Georges Méliès's movie A Trip to the Moon was first shown in the non-stationary Lukiškės Square movie theater in 1902 and was the first feature film shown in Vilnius.

The first stationary movie theater in Vilnius, named Iliuzija, was opened in 1905 and was located in Didžioji Street 60. The first movie theaters were similar to theatre buildings and had boxes with more expensive tickets. Also, because there was no sound in the first movies, the sessions had a live orchestral or musicians performances. On stage, cinema screening was sometimes mixed with theatrical performances, illusion shows.

On 4 June 1924, Vilnius Magistrate established a popular 1,200-seat movie theater in the city hall, which in Polish was called Miejski kinematograf. The purpose of this cinema was to provide cultural education for students and adults. The popularity of this cinema is evidenced by the numbers of viewers in 1926: 502,261 tickets were sold, 24,242 tickets were given free to boarding children, 778 to Vilnius guests and 8,385 to soldiers. In 1939, the Lithuanian authorities renamed it to Milda. In 1940, the last city government handed over the premises to the People's Commissariat of Education, which established the Lithuanian National Philharmonic Society there.

In 1965, the most modern movie theater in Lithuania called Lietuva was opened in Vilnius, which annually had over 1.84 million visitors and profit of over 1 million Rbls. After the reconstruction, it had one of the largest screens in Europe (200 square metres). It was closed in 2002, demolished in 2017 and the MO Museum was built in its place.

Vilnius Film Festival Kino Pavasaris is the biggest and most important cinema event in Lithuania with international guests and thousands of visitors.

Lithuanian Film Centre (Lithuanian: Lietuvos kino centras), whose main task is to promote the development and competitiveness of the Lithuanian film industry, has its headquarters in Vilnius.

Music

Musicians were presented at the Palace of the Grand Dukes of Lithuania as early as the 14th century as Grand Duke Gediminas daughter Aldona of Lithuania already was a large sympathizer of music and took court musicians, singers with her to Kraków after marrying King Casimir III the Great. In the 16th century Vilnius for some time in their lives was a hometown of composer Wacław of Szamotuły, lutenist virtuoso Bálint Bakfark, composers Jan Brant, Heinrich Finck, Cyprian Bazylik, Alessandro Pesenti, Luca Marenzio, Michelagnolo Galilei. One of the first local musicians, known from written sources was Steponas Vilnietis (Stephanus de Vylna). The first textbook of music in Lithuania – The Art and Practice of Music was issued in Vilnius by Žygimantas Liauksminas in 1667.

Italian artists organized the first opera in Lithuania on 4 September 1636 at the Palace of the Grand Dukes by the order of Grand Duke Władysław IV Vasa. Operas are staged at the Lithuanian National Opera and Ballet Theatre and also by independent troupe Vilnius City Opera.

The Lithuanian National Philharmonic Society is the largest and oldest state owned concert organization in Lithuania, whose main activity is to organise and coordinate live concerts, diverse classical/classical contemporary/jazz music events and tours throughout Lithuania and abroad. The Lithuanian State Symphony Orchestra, founded by Gintaras Rinkevičius, every year builds up a wide-ranging repertoire, introduces exceptional programs, and invites young talent to perform along with recognized soloists.

In Lithuania, choral music is very important. Vilnius is the only city with three choirs laureates (Brevis, Jauna Muzika and Chamber Choir of the Conservatoire) at the European Grand Prix for Choral Singing. There is a long-standing tradition of the Dainų šventė (Lithuanian Song and Dance Festival). Since 1990, the festival has been organised every four years and summons roughly 30,000 singers and folk dancers of various professional levels and age groups from across the country in Vingis Park. In 2008, Lithuanian Song and Dance Festival together with its Latvian and Estonian versions was inscribed as UNESCO Masterpiece of the Oral and Intangible Heritage of Humanity.

Jazz scene was active even during the years of Soviet occupation. The real breakthrough would occur in 1970–71 with the coming together of the Ganelin/Tarasov/Chekasin trio, the alleged instigators of the Vilnius Jazz School. Most known annual event of jazz in the city is the Vilnius Jazz Festival.

Gatvės muzikos diena (Street Music Day) gathers musicians of various genres annually in the streets of Vilnius.

Vilnius is the birthplace of many prominent music personalities: singers (e.g. Mariana Korvelytė – Moravskienė, Paulina Rivoli, Danielius Dolskis, Vytautas Kernagis, Algirdas Kaušpėdas, Andrius Mamontovas, Nomeda Kazlaus, Asmik Grigorian), composers (e.g. César Cui, Felix Yaniewicz, Maximilian Steinberg, Vytautas Miškinis, Onutė Narbutaitė), conductors (e.g. Mirga Gražinytė-Tyla), musicians (e.g. Antoni Radziwiłł, Jascha Heifetz, Clara Rockmore, Romas Lileikis).

Vilnius was a hometown of such 18th century composers as Michał Kazimierz Ogiński, Johann David Holland (colleague of C. Bach), Maciej Radziwiłł, Michał Kleofas Ogiński. 19th century Vilnius was famous for such European scale performers as singer Kristina Gerhardi Frank – a close friend of Mozart and Haydn (performed the main part at the premiere of The Creation by the latter), guitarist-virtuoso Marek Konrad Sokołowski, recognized as the best guitarist in Europe in the mid-19th century, composer Stanisław Moniuszko – "the father of Polish national opera". The wealthiest woman in the early 19th century Vilnius was singer Maria de Neri. In the early 20th century, Vilnius was a hometown of Mikalojus Konstantinas Čiurlionis. Musicians of late 20th and early 21st centuries include Vyacheslav Ganelin, Petras Vyšniauskas, Petras Geniušas, Mūza Rubackytė, Alanas Chošnau, Marijonas Mikutavičius.

Lithuanian Academy of Music and Theatre is headquartered in Gediminas Avenue and also has its department at the Slushko Palace in Antakalnis. Many accomplished singers have lectured at the academy, including the internationally famous tenors Kipras Petrauskas and Virgilijus Noreika.

Theatre

Lithuanian Grand Dukes' entertainment at the castle, ruler's visits abroad and the honorable guests' arrival meetings etiquette had theatrical elements already since the 14th century (e.g. musicians' chapels of Gediminas and Władysław II Jagiełło). During the period of Sigismund III Vasa's residence in Vilnius (first half of the 17th century), English professional drama actors' troupes played in the royal manor. In 1635, Władysław IV Vasa established a professional opera theatre in the Lower Castle, where dramma per musica genre productions were performed with operas' librettos being written by Italian Virgilio Puccitelli. The performances were characterized by fundamental, luxurious scenography.

Between the 16th and 18th centuries there was a Jesuit's School Theatre in Lithuania. In 1570, the first performance was shown in Vilnius (comedy Hercules by S. Tucci). Baroque aesthetics prevailed in the Jesuit's School Theatre, but it also had Middle Ages retrospectives, Renaissance elements, Rococo motifs, and served an educational function. The performances were played in Latin, however elements of the Lithuanian language were also included in intermediates and prologues, and some of the works were Lithuanian-themed (e.g. plays dedicated to Algirdas, Mindaugas, Vytautas and other rulers of Lithuania).

In 1785, Wojciech Bogusławski established the city's first public theatre Vilnius City Theatre. The theatre was initially located in the Oskierka Palace, but later moved to the Radziwiłł Palace and the Vilnius Town Hall. Until 1845 the plays were performed in Polish, from 1845 in Polish and Russian and from 1864 only in Russian. After the ban on the Lithuanian language was lifted, the plays were also performed in Lithuanian. The theatre ceased to exist in 1914.

During the interwar, then part of Poland, Vilnius was famous for the most modern in the region experimental Reduta troupe and institute, led by Juliusz Osterwa. In Vilnius and the Vilnius Region, the performances by the Vilnius Lithuanian Stage Amateur Company, established in 1930 (later it was renamed to Vilnius's Lithuanian Theatre; professional theatre Vaidila), were shown. In 1945, it was merged to the Lithuanian National Drama Theatre.

After the USSR occupation of Lithuania in 1940, theatre became one of the means of disseminating the Soviet ideology and censorship of repertoires was introduced. The performances incorporated the principles of socialist realism and a number of revolutionary plays were staged by the Russian authors. A Repertory Commission was established under the Ministry of Culture to direct theatres, control their repertoires, grant permissions to perform or ban performances. Socialist realism was the only recognized direction.

After the restoration of independence of Lithuania, theatre changed cardinally and sought to recreate a broken dialogue with spectators. Vilnius City Opera, an independent opera theatre in Vilnius, blends classical with contemporary art. While the Lithuanian National Drama Theatre, State Small Theatre of Vilnius, State Youth Theatre and a number of private theatre companies, including OKT / Vilnius City Theatre, Anželika Cholina Dance Theatre and others, show classical, modern and Lithuanian playwriting directed by world-known Lithuanian and foreign directors. There is also the Russian-language Old Theatre of Vilnius.

Photography

The beginning of Lithuanian photography is considered to be the daguerreotyping of the reconstructed Verkiai Palace, which was performed in the summer of 1839 by François Marcillac, the governor of the children of Duke Ludwig Wittgenstein, this fact is mentioned in the memoirs of architect Bolesław Podczaszyński published in January 1853 in the Gazeta Warszawska newspaper. The unfavorable political situation in the country led to the slow development of new technology and cultural activities. The first known daguerreotype portrait atelier in Vilnius was opened in 1843 by C. Ziegler; such ateliers operated in Lithuania until 1859. One of the most famous photographers was K. Neupert, who came from Norway (since 1851 he worked in Vilnius and Druskininkai).

In the 1860s with the spread of negative and positive collodion technology, glass negatives and albumen paper were used instead of daguerreotype plates, photo portraits of standardized formats became widespread and commercial photography ateliers were established in Vilnius and other Lithuanian cities. The first landscape and architectural photographs were created by Vilnius photographers Abdonas Korzonas and Albert Swieykowski, who compiled the first set of photographs in Lithuania – the Vilnius Album (32 images). In 1862, the Provisional Censorship Regulations were adopted, which determined the activities of photographic institutions; they were supervised by the Central Press Board of the Ministry of the Interior. Photographers ateliers (4 of 9) who participated in the January Uprising and photographed the rebels were closed, their images were annihilated and the authors were punished (e.g. A. Korzonas was deported to Siberia). Other prominent photographers of the 19th century were Stanisław Filibert Fleury (one of the pioneers of stereoscopic photography), Aleksander Władysław Strauss, Józef Czechowicz.

One of the most important facts about the use of photography for scientific purposes is the second photoheliograph in the world (after London) installed in 1865 at the Vilnius University Astronomical Observatory, which was used to observe and photograph the sunspots. Since 1868, for the first time in the world, a systematic photographic service of sunspots dynamics was launched in Vilnius.

In 1927, Jan Bułhak in Vilnius established the first photography club in the present territory of Lithuania.

In 1952, the editorial office of Švyturys magazine organized the first photography exhibition in Vilnius, the main object of which was photography itself (16 photographers participated).

Crafts

Iron tools, weapons, brass, glass and silver jewelry have been produced in the present territory of Lithuania since the 1st century. Later pottery and production of wood products became widespread, and weaving in the 2nd and 4th centuries. During the period of feudalism, home crafts were the most significant in the conditions of subsistence economy. In the 13th and 14th centuries, the separation of crafts from agriculture accelerated; crafts have become an independent branch of the economy. The Grand Dukes of Lithuania promoted the development of crafts in cities. Weaving, shoemaking, fur-making and other crafts predominated. With the introduction of foreign artisans (early 14th century), the development of crafts accelerated even further. The development of crafts and trade stimulated the growth of Vilnius and other Lithuanian cities. In the 14th and 15th centuries, crafts were already highly specialized (especially in the production of tools, household items, fabrics, clothing, weapons, and jewelry) and at the same time workshops were established, which trained and defended the interests of craftsmen. In the 16th century, the production of fine glassware began, goldsmithing was developed, and the level of pottery and weaving crafts rose. The Statutes of Lithuania (1529 and 1588 editions) mention 25 crafts. Prominent European goldsmiths worked in the Vilnius Goldsmiths' Workshop (established in 1495), which controlled the trade of precious metals, gemstones and stood out for its wealth as it serviced the territory up to Daugava and Dnieper Rivers, as well as the Catholic Church in Lithuania, the manor of the Grand Duke, nobility, townspeople. No less important was the Vilnius Mint, which was the main mint of the Grand Duchy of Lithuania and minted the Lithuanian denarius, shillings, groschens, thalers, ducats, and other coins from 1387 to 1666.

In the second half of the 17th century, due to the economic turmoil caused by the Russo-Polish War, crafts declined, most of the goods were imported from abroad duty-free by Szlachta Lithuanian and Polish nobles and sold on their holdings. Crafts began to rise again in the second half of the 18th century to the first half of the 19th century and Vilnius was the largest Lithuanian craft center. After the abolition of serfdom, craft schools were established in the Lithuanian cities. The growing industry begun to push crafts from some areas of food processing, textiles and metalworking. However, crafts have long prevailed in clothing manufacturing, goldsmithing, wood, food processing, and other fields. During the years of Soviet occupation, craftsmen worked in artels (until 1960), after their abolition - in household service combines. After the restoration of Lithuania's independence, crafts complemented small and medium-sized businesses.

Language

As a historically multicultural city, the language status changed significantly over the centuries. The predominant language of public life in medieval Lithuania was Lithuanian. It was spoken by commoners as well as in the ruler's manor and among the local nobility. However, the Lithuanian language had no literary traditions and was not used in writing, except for the most important religious texts (e.g. the Lord's and the Hail Mary prayers). However, a spoken knowledge of Lithuanian was not lost, as Vytautas the Great spoke in Lithuanian with Jogaila, whose son Casimir IV Jagiellon also spoke Lithuanian. Saint Casimir, the patron saint of Lithuania, was a polyglot and knew Lithuanian, Polish, German and Latin languages. The Byzantine historian Laonikos Chalkokondyles in the 15th century reported that the Lithuanians had their own distinct language.

The Ruthenian language was used in Lithuania and its capital Vilnius due to the incorporation of the Kievan Rus' lands. In colloquial form, these dialects formed the basis of the Ukrainian and Byelorussian languages in the 19th century. The written form of the Ruthenian language stemmed from the interaction of Old East Slavic with the local elements of the Ruthenian language. Such a Ruthenian language became the main language of the Chancery of the Grand Duchy of Lithuania in the 14th and 15th centuries and maintained its dominant position until the middle of the 17th century.

Latin and Polish were also widely used in the Chancery of the Grand Duchy of Lithuania. In the second part of the 17th century, the Polish language ousted the Ruthenian language from the written sources and the Lithuanian language from most areas of the public life. The first state documents in the Lithuanian language appeared in the Grand Duchy of Lithuania only at the very end of its existence (e.g. Constitution of 3 May 1791 and the Great Sejm Lithuanian manuscripts, Kościuszko Uprising Lithuanian notes).

At the royal court in Vilnius of Sigismund II Augustus, the last Grand Duke of Lithuania prior to the Union of Lublin, both Polish and Lithuanian were spoken equally widely. In 1552, Grand Duke Sigismund II Augustus ordered that orders of the Magistrate of Vilnius be announced in Lithuanian, Polish, and Ruthenian languages.

Minorities (e.g. Lithuanian Jews, Lipka Tatars, Crimean Karaites) were under the guardianship of the Grand Duke of Lithuania, but their languages were only used among themselves and never gained a significant role. The 2nd and 3rd Statutes of Lithuania consolidated Lithuanian Jews status as non-Christian and "common human" (non-noble).

According to article 14 of the Constitution of Lithuania, Lithuanian is the only official language in the state. Therefore, all the official procedures in Vilnius are proceeded in Lithuanian. However, interpreter assistance is guaranteed by the state in some cases.

Fashion

It is known that the Vilnians have enjoyed to expensively dress up since the Middle Ages. According to historian Antanas Čaplinskas, even the merchants and craftsmen wives were wearing multiple rings decorated with gemstones (e.g. with ruby and fourteen diamonds). Those who did not dress up and did not followed the fashion trends were even ridiculed (e.g. for wearing sheepskins, for not wearing luxurious belts, gloves, or for not using handkerchiefs). Property inventories of 16th–17th centuries often mention expensive clothing, such as long, wide-sleeved jackets of precious materials, known as kontusz, and żupans decorated with lynx's or other animal fur, also kontush belts. Special attention was paid to the buttons as in the list of one nobleman's property Čaplinskas found 12 buttons with pearls and corals, about 100 large buttons with diamonds, plum-shaped buttons decorated with enamel, as well as buttons made from brilliants, emeralds. Delias and dolmans were also popular among the townspeople and nobles.

Wealthy townspeople, decorated with luxurious clothing, raised the envy of the Lithuanian nobility and the nobles demanded the adoption of laws limiting the clothing of the townspeople. For the first time such restrictions were recorded in the Statute of Lithuania of 1588, according to which the townspeople were allowed to wear only two rings (one of them was the seal) while Jews were forbidden to adorn with gold chains and brooches (though, the Jewish women had more rights). Even wider restrictions were put in place by the Sejm of the Polish–Lithuanian Commonwealth which adopted the Act of Thrift in 1613, according to which the non-noble townspeople were forbidden to appear in public places dressed in expensive furs (violators of the law were fined and the clothes were given to the complainants). The wealthy townspeople were not satisfied with such limitations, therefore a subscription fee was introduced later which removed all limitations.

The clothing trends changed in the late 18th century when almost all men already had shaved beards, short-haired hairstyles and began to wear trendy, blue, green or black tailcoats with open-fronts and waistcoats matched with white or yellowish trousers, while the 18th century women's clothing fashion had almost no differences from the Western European fashion trends. In the early 20th century the clothes were already in line with the Western European fashion trends, and in 1961 clothing designers studies were launched in the State Art Institute of Lithuania, also in the same year the Vilnius Model House was established which created and popularized unique and industrial apparel and footwear models, made clothing presentations.

Mados infekcija was launched in 1999 and is the biggest Lithuanian fashion show, held every spring in Vilnius. Prominent Lithuanian clothing designer Juozas Statkevičius usually organizes his collections presentations in Vilnius.

Holidays and festivals

As a result of centuries long Catholic traditions in Vilnius and Lithuania, the Catholic holidays (e.g. Christmas, Easter, Saint John's Eve) are widely celebrated and employees have a days off.

Every year on 16 February (day of the Act of Independence of Lithuania) and on 11 March (day of the Act of the Re-Establishment of the State of Lithuania) festive events are organized in Vilnius with official ceremonies conducted by the heads of state and the holy masses of the Lithuanian Catholic Church in the Vilnius Cathedral. While in the evening of 12 January bonfires are ignited to mark the bloody January Events.

Saint Casimir's Fair has been held annually for hundreds of years in the city's markets and streets on the Sunday nearest to 4 March (Feast of St. Casimir), the anniversary of Saint Casimir's death. It attracts tens of thousands of visitors and many Lithuanian and foreign craftsmen. Easter palms are one of the most recognizable symbols of the fair.

Capital's Days is the biggest festival of music and culture held in the city annually for three days (from 30 August to 1 September).

Although it is not a national holiday, the Vilnia River is dyed green every year for Saint Patrick's Day.

During the annual Vilnius Culture Night various artists and cultural organisations hold events and performances all over the city.

Administration

City government

Before the Magdeburg rights were granted to Vilnius in 1378, the city was overseen by the ruler's vicegerents. Later these duties were granted to a magistrate or a City Council, subordinate only to the ruler himself. During wars, when the city was in a danger, the city was led by a Voivode of Vilnius. The magisterial authority was headquartered at the Vilnius Town Hall.

Vilnius Magistrate was responsible for the city economy, was collecting taxes, taking care of the city treasury, was accumulating stocks of grain in order to avoid residents starvation in case of famine or wars. He also acted as a notary in transactions, testaments and as a judge during the city residents conflicts that involved new buildings constructions and reconstructions. His other function was taking care of the city craftsmen. From the beginning, statutes of workshops were approved by the ruler himself. Later, Sigismund II Augustus granted this privilege to the city magistrates in 1552. Since the 1522 privilege by Sigismund I the Old, Vilnius Magistrates had the responsibility to protect the city and its resident's tranquility by having 24 armed guards. During war times, the night watch was performed by three jurisdictions – magistrate, bishop and castle men.

Chief City Administrator was vaitas (a Grand Duke of Lithuania vicegerent in the city). Most of them were beginning their careers in the magistracy before obtaining such a position. All vaitai were Catholics. Vaitas was chairing during the City Council meetings. His competence also included criminal cases and he had the right to impose a death penalty. At first, he examined the cases alone, however since the 16th century two suolininkai also examined important cases (if the lawsuit was over 10 groschen) together with the vaitas. In the 16th century, Vilnius City Council consisted of 12 burgomasters and 24 councilors (half of them were Catholics, the other half were orthodoxes). There were no direct elections to the City Council and members to the council were chosen by the wealthy townspeople, merchants, workshops seniors. Burgomasters were being chosen until their deaths. In case of death, another member of the council was being chosen of the same religion. In 1536, Sigismund I the Old signed a privilege which regulated the magistracy formation principles that prohibited to choose close relatives to the council and all the new taxes, obligations and regulations required the prior agreement of the townspeople.

Under the Russian Empire, the City Council was replaced with a City Duma. The city was the capital of the Lithuania Governorate in 1797–1801, Vilna Governorate-General in 1794–1912, and Vilna Governorate in 1795–1915.

After the Soviet occupation of Lithuania, Vilnius became a republican subordinate city and capital of the Lithuanian Soviet Socialist Republic.

The current Vilnius City Municipal Council was established in 1990. The Vilnius City Municipality is one of 60 municipalities of Lithuania and includes the nearby town of Grigiškės, three villages, and some rural areas. The town of Grigiškės was separated from the Trakai District Municipality and attached to the Vilnius City Municipality in 2000.

A 50-member council is elected to four-year terms; the candidates are nominated by registered political parties and committees. As of the 2011 elections, independent candidates also were permitted. The last election was held in March 2019 and the results were: Public Election Committee "R. Šimašius Team "For Vilnius, which we are proud of" (17 seats), A. Zuokas and Vilnius Citizens Coalition "Happy Vilnius" (10 seats), Homeland Union – Lithuanian Christian Democrats (9 seats), the coalition of the Electoral Action of Poles in Lithuania and Russians Alliance "Christian Families Alliance" (6 seats), Labour Party (5 seats), Lithuanian Farmers and Greens Union (3 seats).

Before 2015, mayors were appointed by the council. Starting with the elections in 2015, the mayors are elected directly in a two-round system by voters registered in the municipality. Remigijus Šimašius became the first directly elected mayor of the city.

Subdivisions
Elderships, a statewide administrative division, function as municipal districts. The 21 elderships are based on neighbourhoods:

 Verkiai – includes Baltupiai, Jeruzalė, Santariškės, Balsiai, Visoriai
 Antakalnis – includes Valakampiai, Turniškės, Dvarčionys
 Pašilaičiai – includes Tarandė
 Fabijoniškės – includes Bajorai
 Pilaitė
 Justiniškės
 Viršuliškės
 Šeškinė
 Šnipiškės
 Žirmūnai – includes Šiaurės miestelis
 Karoliniškės
 Žvėrynas
 Grigiškės – a separate town
 Lazdynai
 Vilkpėdė – includes Vingis Park
 Naujamiestis – includes bus and train stations
 Senamiestis (Old Town) – includes Užupis
 Naujoji Vilnia – includes Pavilnys, Pūčkoriai
 Paneriai – includes Trakų Vokė, Gariūnai
 Naujininkai – includes Kirtimai, Salininkai, Vilnius International Airport
 Rasos – includes Belmontas, Markučiai

District municipality

Vilnius District Municipality is one of the largest municipalities in Lithuania. It occupies 2129 square kilometres and has 23 civil parishes. There are 1163 villages and 5 towns (Nemenčinė, Bezdonys, Maišiagala, Mickūnai and Šumskas) in the district. Vilnius district surrounds the Lithuania's capital and has developed public, business rural infrastructure and offers high standard of living with clean environment. Vilnius district borders with the Republic of Belarus and neighbours with Švenčionys, Moletai, Širvintos, Elektrėnai, Trakai and Šalčininkai districts.

Vilnius district has a multinational population, of which 52% are Poles, 33% are Lithuanians and the rest of 16% are Russians, Belarusians and other nationalities residents (e.g. Ukrainians, Lipka Tatars, Jews). Vilnius district has over 100,000 residents. Most of the population (95%) live in villages and 5% live in towns.

Vilnius district has the highest terrains of Lithuania – Aukštojas, Juozapinė and Kruopinė Hills, which are raised over 290 metres above sea level and are considered very high in the country's flatlands.

Palm Sunday is widely celebrated in the district and the unique and colorful Vilnian Easter palms (verbos) are made there from dried flowers and herbs. The tradition of making Vilnius palms is dated to the times of St. Casimir, who is a patron saint of Lithuania and Lithuanian youth.

Medininkai Castle, Liubavas Manor mill and Bareikiškės Manor are the most famous historical landmarks of the district.

Vilnius Voivodeship from 1769 surrounded a completely independent microstate Republic of Paulava, known for its Age of Enlightenment values, with its own president, peasants parliament, army and laws.

As a result of its large Polish population, Vilnius District Municipality Council mostly consists from members of the Electoral Action of Poles in Lithuania. Lithuanian Pole Marija Rekst is a long-term mayor of the district.

National government

As the capital of Lithuania, Vilnius is the seat of Lithuania's national government. For the executive, the two chief officers of Lithuania have their offices in Vilnius. The President of the Republic of Lithuania resides at the Presidential Palace in Daukanto Square, while the Prime Minister's seat is at the Government of Lithuania office in Gediminas Avenue. According to the Law of the President of the Republic of Lithuania, the President of the Republic has a residence in Vilnius that is located in Turniškės district near Neris river. Prime Minister also has a right to a residence in Turniškės district during term in office. Government ministries are located in various parts of the city; many are located in Vilnius Old Town.

Historically, the Seimas of the Grand Duchy of Lithuania mostly gathered in Vilnius. The present-day Seimas of the Republic of Lithuania is also located in Vilnius and meets at the Seimas Palace in Gediminas Avenue.

Lithuania's highest courts are located in Vilnius. The Supreme Court of Lithuania, the highest court in the judicial order, which reviews criminal and civil cases, is located in the Gynėjų Street, while the Supreme Administrative Court of Lithuania, which acts as the highest court in the administrative order, judging litigation against public bodies, is located in the Žygimantų Street. The Constitutional Court of Lithuania, an advisory body with ultimate authority on the constitutionality of laws meets in the Constitutional Court's Palace in Gediminas Avenue.

The Lithuanian Tribunal, the highest appeal court for the nobility of the Grand Duchy of Lithuania, was established by Stephen Báthory, Grand Duke of Lithuania and King of Poland, in 1581. It was located in Vilnius until the Third Partition of Poland in 1795.

Special services

The security of Vilnius is mainly the responsibility of the Vilniaus apskrities vyriausiasis policijos komisariatas, the highest police office in the city, and local police offices. Its main responsibilities are ensuring public order and public safety, disclosure and investigation of criminal offenses and traffic safety supervision. In 2016, there were 1500 police officers in Vilnius. Public Security Service is responsible for the prompt restoration of public order in extreme and special situations and ensure proper protection of important state objects and escorted subjects.

Vilniaus apskrities priešgaisrinė gelbėjimo valdyba is the primary governing body of the Vilnius's firefighters forces. In the first 9 months of 2018, there were 1287 fire incidents in the city of Vilnius, during which 6 people died and 16 were traumatized.

Vilniaus greitosios medicinos pagalbos stotis is responsible for emergency medical services in the city and can be contacted directly by calling a short number 033. It is one of the oldest emergency medical services institution in Eastern Europe and was established already in 1902. Large part of this institution doctors and other personnel were awarded with medals for their assistance to victims during the January Events in 1991.

Major number for contacting all the special services in Vilnius (and other regions of Lithuania) is 112.

Cityscape

Urbanism and architecture

Its history begins from the Neolithic period. During it, the glacial hills were intermittently occupied and a wooden castle, at the confluence of the Neris and Vilnia rivers, was built around 1000 AD to fortify Gedimino Hill. The settlement developed into a town in the 13th century, when the pagan Baltic people were invaded by the Westerners during the Lithuanian Crusade. Around 1323, when the first written sources about Vilnia occurred, it was the capital of the Grand Duchy of Lithuania, which was formed from various cultures and nationalities residents. At this time, it only had some brick structures. By the 15th century, the Grand Duchy of Lithuania had become one of the most powerful and the largest country in Europe with its territory stretching from the Baltic Sea to the Black Sea (mostly, present-day Belarus, Ukraine and Russia lands). The historic centre consists of three castles territories (Upper, Lower and Curved) and the area that was previously encircled by a Wall of Vilnius. Its plan is mostly circular with its center in the original castle site. The streets pattern is medieval and has small, narrow streets, however large squares were also developed in later periods. Pilies Street, the main artery, links the Palace of the Grand Dukes of Lithuania with Vilnius Town Hall. Other streets meander through the palaces of feudal lords and landlords, churches, shops and craftsmen's workrooms.

The historic buildings are in Gothic (e.g. Church of St. Anne), Renaissance (e.g. Palace of the Grand Dukes of Lithuania), Baroque (e.g. Church of St. Peter and St. Paul with over 2,000 stucco figures interior, Vilnius University's main campus, which features 13 courtyards framed by 15th century buildings and splashed with 300-year-old frescoes, and the Church of St. Johns) and Classical styles (e.g. Vilnius Cathedral, Vilnius Town Hall, Šuazeliai Palace, Verkiai Palace) with splendid exteriors and interiors. The variety of preserved churches and former palaces of the Lithuanian nobility especially constitutes the Vilnius multicultural heritage.

As a capital of the massive state, Lithuanians shaped the development of its outstanding capital together with other nations. Vilnius development was influenced by the West and East ideologies. Christianity has dominated in Lithuania since the Christianization of Lithuania in 1387, however Orthodoxy of the state's eastern residents and the growing importance of Judaism led to exemplary material manifestations of these religious communities (e.g. Orthodox Cathedral of the Theotokos, Great Synagogue of Vilna).

Various disasters resulted in reconstructions of the Vilnius buildings in the School of Vilnius Baroque style, which later left an imprint in the whole Grand Duchy of Lithuania. Talented artists (e.g. Matteo Castelli, Pietro Perti) from the present-day Canton of Ticino were particularly preferred by the Grand Duke of Lithuania and local nobility, and developed many famous objects in the city (e.g. Chapel of Saint Casimir). Lithuanian Laurynas Gucevičius left a huge mark in the Classical style architecture of Vilnius.

Vilnius Old Town was inscribed to the list of the UNESCO World Heritage Sites in 1994. The inscribed property has an extension of 352 ha. Vilnius Historic Centre is particularly noted for maintaining the medieval streets pattern without any significant gaps. However, some places were damaged during Lithuania's occupations and wars, including the Cathedral Square that covers the foundations of the Royal Palace – demolished after the 3rd partition of the Polish–Lithuanian Commonwealth in 1795, a square in the east from the Church of All Saints where the Convent of the Barefoot Carmelites previously stood alongside a Vice-Chancellor Stefan Pac's established Baroque Church of St. Joseph the Betrothed, both demolished by the tsar's order. Great Synagogue and part of the buildings in the Vokiečių Street were demolished after World War II.

Vilnius occupies an area of 401 square kilometers, of which only one fifth is developed and the remainder is green belt and water. For this reason, Vilnius is often referred to as one of the 'greenest' capital cities in Europe.

Crypts
The crypts of Vilnius Cathedral are a place where prominent figures of Lithuania and the Catholic Church are buried. At the Royal Mausoleum Grand Duke Alexander Jagiellon, Queen Elizabeth of Austria, Barbara Radziwiłł, heart of the Grand Duke Władysław IV Vasa are buried. These crypts also have one of the oldest frescos in Lithuania, painted in the late 14th or early 15th century, and dating to the times of the Christianization of Lithuania.

Housing

Vilnius Old Town with medieval stone paved streets and Užupis offers one of the most prestigious housing in Vilnius. Many old town apartment buildings there offers direct views to the iconic churches or the biggest landmarks of the city (e.g. especially desired Gediminas Tower), enclosed inner courtyards, high ceilings, attics, non-standard layouts and luxurious historic interiors. Most expensive flats in these neighbourhoods may cost millions of euros and are accessible only to the wealthiest residents of the city. However, such problems as traffic jams, expensive car parking spaces, air pollution, high costs of maintenance, limitations for reconstructions repels rich Vilnians from living in these neighbourhoods, who often buy or build private houses in more distant parts of Vilnius (Balsiai, Bajorai, Pavilnys, Kalnėnai, Pilaitė and others) or nearby areas of the Vilnius District Municipality. Around 21,000 residents live in the old town and 7,000 in Užupis.

Valakampiai and Turniškės are the city's most prestigious places with private houses quarters as plots there are sufficiently large, surrounded with the greenery, pines forests and are easily accessible from the city centre. Generally, exceptionally wealthy residents and heads of the state (e.g. presidents) live there and most of the larger private houses costs millions of euros. Part of the Žvėrynas neighbourhood also offers luxurious private houses with plots close to the Vingis Park, but it also has the Soviet-era apartment buildings, poor condition wooden houses, higher number of residents (~12,200).

Neighbourhoods around the old town (Antakalnis, Žirmūnai, Naujamiestis, Žvėrynas) offer a wide variety prices flats, decent amount of greenery suitable for walks, bicycle roads and therefore are the most popular among the middle class residents. Wealthier communities are living in a new construction apartments or renovated Soviet-era apartments. The Government of Lithuania strongly supports the renovation process and compensates 30% or more of the cost. However, poorer inhabitants and low income pensioners are often stopping the process adding to overall regionalistic policies of the politicians.

More distant neighbourhoods (e.g. Lazdynai, Karoliniškės, Viršuliškės, Šeškinė, Justiniškės, Pašilaičiai, Fabijoniškės, Naujininkai) are offering significantly cheaper flats. Their biggest disadvantages together with a more difficult communication with the city centre are mostly not renovated Soviet-era high-rise buildings, worn out surroundings, large traffic jams on the streets connecting with the city centre during the rush hours and a constant lack of car parking spaces near older apartments.

Šnipiškės eldership has received a significant amount of investment during the 2010s. The area was first mentioned in the Vilnius's historical documents in 1536 when the Grand Duke Sigismund I the Old ordered Ulrich Hosius to build a wooden bridge over the Neris river. Soon around the bridge, a suburb began to develop. In the 16th a palace dedicated to the Muscovites and Tatars messengers was built by the magistrate of Vilnius to the north of Šnipiškės, as during their visits, they acted noisily and the townspeople did not want them around. In the 18th century, a Jesuit's Church of St. Raphael the Archangel and monastery as well as solid palaces of the rich and multi-story brick houses of ordinary townspeople were built in Šnipiškės. On the other hand, the outskirts of this suburb were inhabited by the craftsmen: the glass-makers, brick-makers, pottery-makers. Smoking pipe factory, sawmills and even a tiny candy factory emerged. A small part of the territory (8 ha) of Šnipiškės west of the Kalvarijų market, called Skansenas, occupied mostly by poor condition wooden houses, emerged in the late 19th century. Surprisingly, it survived to this day and is now still underdeveloped territory, protected by the state. Next to it, then-luxurious quarter of bankers – Piromontas was built in the 1890s, is architectural heritage too.

During the 1960s, the Šnipiškės area was named the New City Centre: the first city pedestrian zone organized and before the 1990 a number of buildings, including the largest shopping centre in what was then Lithuanian SSR, the highest and the largest hotel, planetarium, museum of Revolution, Pioneer's Palace as well as number of ministries of the Lithuanian SSR were built. However, the broader territory of Šnipiškės, stretching to the north of what is now Konstitucijos Avenue, remained mainly underdeveloped until the early 2000s when the new Vilnius city municipality building was built in the area, that inspired transformation of the surroundings: the new Europa square formed with a new shopping center "Europa", 33-story "Europa" business tower and 27-story "Europa" apartment building. Former Museum of Revolution was reconstructed into the National Art Gallery in the late 2000s. Since then skyscrapers and expensive commercial offices are being built constantly in the area. It already has almost 0.5 million square meters of real estate. A Japanese garden will be completed in the area till 2020.

According to the economists, number of transactions and housing affordability index has reached record highs in 2019 because of the significant rise in Vilnius residents incomes and slowing of the flats prices rising. Despite that, according to a research one fourth of the 26–35 years old inhabitants are still living in their parents or relatives owned homes, which is the highest number in the Baltic states, however it is likely that large part of these young people are simply saving for their own homes or the initial contribution because statistics traditionally shows that Lithuanians purchases their homes with less borrowed funds than Latvians or Estonians.

Demographics

Vilnius has thousands of years of demographics history as in the eldership of Vilkpėdė the remains of the Magdalenian culture settlement were found, which are dated to around 10,000 years BC. In the first 1,000 years AD there were large settlements in Kairėnai, Pūčkoriai and Naujoji Vilnia. The most densely populated area was the confluence of the Neris and Vilnia Rivers, which also had fortified homesteads. Later Vilnius was part of the Kingdom of Lithuania territory, however King Mindaugas did not constantly reside in it, despite building the first Catholic Church in Lithuania there on the occasion of his coronation. The city began to develop in the late 13th century, during the reign of Grand Dukes Butvydas and Vytenis.

Major growth of Vilnius as the centre and capital of the medieval state is attributed to the 14th century reign of Grand Duke Gediminas who invited knights, merchants, doctors, craftspeople and others to come to the Grand Duchy to practice their trades and faith without restriction. Although, the growth of Vilnius was limited at the time due to the brutal Teutonic Order attacks (e.g. during their assault in 1390 around 14,000 Vilnians were killed) and the Lithuanian Civil War of 1389–1392.

Vilnius developed as a multicultural city. In the 14th century sources it is mentioned that Vilnius consists of the Great (Lithuanian) city and Ruthenians city. Until the 16th century the city was mostly inhabited by Lithuanians and Ruthenians, however the German merchants, artisans, Jews (since the 14th century; later had their qahal until 1845) and the Tartars (since 1397) also settled down in Vilnius. In the 16th–17th centuries, during Reformation and Counter-Reformation, the Polonophone population began to grow – by the middle of the 17th century most writings were in Polish due to the Polonisation (before the 16th century the number was only around 5%).

The city prospered during the Golden Age by being one of the main cities of the Polish–Lithuanian Commonwealth and the residence of the Lithuanian nobility. However, the city was severely devastated by fire in 1610. After the Battle of Vilnius in 1655 the city came under Russian control (1655–1661). Next, after the Great Northern War, the Swedish Empire controlled the city from 1702 to 1709. This occupation ended during the Great Northern War plague outbreak in 1709. It took the city more than 50 years to recover.

According to the first population census of the Commonwealth in 1790, the Vilnius Voivodeship (without the Grodno County) had a population of 718,571 residents, while the Vilnius County had 105,896 residents (the whole Grand Duchy after the Second Partition had a population of 1,333,493 then). Shortly after, the city population decreased to just 17,500 residents in 1796 due to the fierce battles of the Vilnius uprising in 1794, which was the last attempt to save the Grand Duchy's capital from falling under the complete Russian control. Though, after the rebels defeat, Vilnius was incorporated into the Russian Empire and was its third largest city in the beginning of the 19th century. After a few decades of the Russian despotism, Vilnius demographics were once again affected by the November Uprising in 1830 and the January Uprising in 1863, during which rebels attempts were made to restore the statehood. According to the Russian Empire Census of 1897, Vilnius had 154,532 residents and later grown to 205,300 residents in 1909, while the Vilna Governorate had 1,561,713 residents in 1897.

During World War I thousands of Vilnians were forced to flee, were killed or were taken to the forced labor camps; consequently the city had only 128,500 residents in 1919 (in total, the present-day Lithuania territory lost around 1 million residents). Vilnius recovered during the interwar period and had 209,442 residents in 1939, but due to World War II the number fell to 110,000 in 1944.

Vilnius again grew in population by being the capital of the Lithuanian Soviet Socialist Republic (according to the 1989 census, it had 576,747 residents). Despite the fact that almost whole Lithuania suffered from a large emigration after the restoration of independence in 1990, the number of residents in Vilnius remained almost unchanged (542,287 in 2001) and began to steadily grow every year since 2006 to 580,020 residents (as of 1 January 2020).

Historic ethnic makeup

Around 1000 years AD, the confluence of the Neris and Vilnia rivers was densely populated by the Brushed Pottery culture, which had a half a hectare fortified settlement on the Gediminas' Hill. The tribes of this culture were common throughout present-day Lithuania, east of the Šventoji River and in western Belarus. The direct descendants of this culture were a Baltic tribe – the Aukštaitians. According to a prominent researcher of Vilnius history Antanas Čaplinskas, who researched the surnames of Vilnius residents in the archive documents of the city, the oldest surviving surnames of Vilnius residents are Lithuanian. Pagan Lithuanians mostly lived at the northern foot of Gediminas' Hill and in the Crooked Castle.

Later, following the invitation of Grand Duke Gediminas, merchants and craftsmen began to move to Vilnius from the cities of the German Hanseatic League, France, Italy and Spain, and replaced the Lithuanian surnames with German, Polish, and Russian surnames. In the late 14th century, during the reign of Grand Duke Algirdas, Vilnius already had a Ruthenian quarter in the present-day Latako and Rusų Streets, as the trade relations between the Grand Duchy of Lithuania and the Ruthenian principalities were quite well developed, therefore quite a few Ruthenian merchants lived there and the Ruthenian nobles had their residences in the quarter. The variety of nations in Vilnius was further increased by Grand Duke Vytautas the Great, who introduced Litvak Jews, Tatars and Crimean Karaites. After a few hundred years, the number of locals in Vilnius was smaller than the number of newcomers. However, according to an analysis of the tax registers of 1572, Lithuania proper had 850,000 residents of which 680,000 were Lithuanians.

Beginning during the Polish–Lithuanian Commonwealth, the Polish culture began to penetrate the city rapidly and soon the Polish language prevailed in the city, even the Magistrate's documents were written in Polish until the November Uprising in 1831. After living for a while in Vilnius, foreign merchants and artisans quickly assimilated and were Polonized. The majority of the Lithuanian nobles spoke the Polish language, however they never considered themselves Poles and the Union of Lublin was only signed during the second attempt in 1569, with the agreement that both states will be sovereign entities within the Commonwealth. Their opinion did not change within the union and was confirmed again in the Reciprocal Guarantee of Two Nations in 1791.

Over the centuries, the composition of the population of Vilnius changed to become ethnically less Lithuanian. According to historian Vytautas Merkys, the city lost a great deal of its old population during the brutal rampages of the Swedish and Russian armies in the 17th and 18th centuries, and they were replaced by the newcomers, however the Lithuanians also constantly inhabited in Vilnius. According to the Russian Empire Census of 1897, only 2.1% (3200 residents) identified themselves as Lithuanian-speakers, while the speakers of Polish language (30.8%; 47,600 residents) and Yiddish (40.0%; 61,800 residents) were the largest linguistic groups of the city. According to the Parish censuses of 1857–1858, the Lithuanian population remained significant in the Vilna Governorate and, according to different authors, was between 23.6% and 50.0% (210,273–418,880 residents). In 1863, ethnographer Roderich von Erckert identified that the largest ethnic group in the Vilna Governorate were Lithuanians (45.04%; 386,000 residents). Among the Szlachta (nobility) in Vilnius during the census of 1897, there were 5,301 (46.3%) local nobles and 6,403 (54.7%) newcomers, of these 24.1% noble newcomers came from Vilna Governorate territories, while the rest of newcomers nobles came to Vilnius from Grodno Governorate, Minsk Governorate, Vitebsk Governorate, Kovno Governorate, Vistula Land and other regions.

Ethnic Lithuanian numbers in the city of Vilnius reached record lows in 1931 (1600 residents – 0.8%, while Poles accounted for 65.9% – 128,600 residents) following the 1922 annexation of Vilnius Region by Poland and the Lithuanians retreat from the region to the temporary capital of Kaunas. Following the Soviet–Lithuanian Mutual Assistance Treaty in 1939, Lithuania regained one third of Vilnius Region and made efforts to Lithuanize Vilnius by the introduction of Lithuanian laws. Prime Minister Antanas Merkys once said that it was intended "to make everybody think like Lithuanians. First of all, it was and still is necessary to comb out the foreign element from the Vilnius Region". The Lithuanian Government put into force a law according to which "who on 12 July 1920 (...) were regarded as Lithuanian nationals, and on 27 October 1939 were resident in the territory became Lithuanian nationals" (this definition of citizenship was used to dismiss a large number of Polish civil servants as during the Interbellum period about 88,000 Poles migrated to Vilnius from as far as Małopolska), while around 150,000 Poles were repatriated from the Lithuanian SSR in 1945–1956. Almost the whole Jewish population was exterminated during the Holocaust in Lithuania. After World War II, the number of ethnic Lithuanians in the city started recovering (e.g. there already were 79,363 Lithuanians in 1959, who accounted for 33.6% of all residents in the city), however the Lithuanization ideas were mostly replaced with the Sovietization of the population after the rigged election to the People's Seimas in 1940. Following the restoration of independence in 1990, the ethnic Lithuanian population in the city continued to grow in 2011 to 63.2% (337,000 residents), and in 2021 to 67,44 % (373,513 inhabitants) according to the censuses.

Economy

Vilnius is the major economic centre of Lithuania. The GDP per capita (nominal) in Vilnius metropolitan area (Vilnius County) is almost €30,000, making it the wealthiest city in Lithuania and the second-wealthiest city in the Baltic states after Tallinn.

The budget of Vilnius reached €1.0 billion in 2022. As of Q4 of 2022 the average monthly salary in Vilnius city municipality reached €2,115 (gross) and €1,307 (net).

Since 2010, employment and unemployment indicators have continuously been improving in Lithuania. Employment reached a record high of 77.5% in the third quarter of 2018 while unemployment was 6.3% in the fourth quarter, a rate last observed in 2008. Nevertheless, this has to be seen in the context of a shrinking working age population. The activity rate reached 82% in 2017. Vilnius and Kaunas counties offer better labour market opportunities than other counties, and this drives the internal interregional migration. However, in other regions employment opportunities remain scarce. Unemployment rates remained persistently high in the least developed regions (14.9% in Utena County as compared to 4.8% in Vilnius County). Other key labour market indicators have improved, returning to pre-crisis levels. Long-term unemployment fell to 2.1% in the third quarter of 2018 (EU average: 2.9%). Youth unemployment (13.3%) and the rate of young people not in employment, education or training (NEET, at 9.1%) were below the EU average in 2017.

Overall, the share of the population at risk of poverty or social exclusion (AROPE) has decreased since Lithuania joined the EU in 2004. However, it remains among the highest in the EU (29.6% in 2017, compared to 22.4% in the EU). The risk of poverty or social exclusion in rural areas is nearly double that of urban areas, which corresponds to the gap in the unemployment rate between cities and rural areas (4.5% versus 11% in 2017). In particular the metropolitan areas of Vilnius and Kaunas, where significant economic activity is centred, drive a significant gap between AROPE rates in urban and rural areas. In 2017, the AROPE rate in rural areas was 37.2%, compared to 19.9% in cities.

Over the past 15 years, Lithuania has experienced the fastest convergence in the EU, but the benefits of economic growth are uneven across regions. Disparities among Lithuania's regions have steadily grown in this period. While GDP per capita reached nearly 110% of the EU average in the capital region of Vilnius, it is only between 42% and 77% in other regions. The country's rapid convergence is mainly fuelled by two regions – the capital region of Vilnius and Kaunas County – producing 42% and 20% of the national GDP, respectively. In 2014–2016 these regions grew on average by 4.6% (Vilnius) and 3.3% (Kaunas), while the other regions, which have a higher share of rural areas, stagnated or were in recession.

The supply of new housing in Vilnius and its suburbs, the country's biggest real estate market, has reached post-crisis highs and the stock of unsold apartments in the three largest cities has started to increase since the
beginning of 2017. The demand for housing is still strong, fuelled by rapidly rising wages, benign financial conditions and positive expectations. In the first half of 2018, the number of monthly transactions was the highest since the 2007–2008 peak. Most foreign direct investment and productive public investment in Lithuania is concentrated around the two main economic development poles of Vilnius and Kaunas.

Vilnius Industrial Park is located 18.5 kilometres from the city and its land is intended for commercial, industrial use.

Science and research

In 1675, Tito Livio Burattini lived in Vilnius and published a book Misura universale in which he suggested to use term metre for a unit of length for the first time. In 1753, on the initiative of Thomas Zebrowski the Vilnius University Astronomical Observatory was established, which was among the first observatories in Europe and the first in the Polish-Lithuanian Commonwealth. Marcin Odlanicki Poczobutt led the reconstruction of the observatory in 1770–72 (according to Marcin Knackfus project) and made sure it was equipped with the latest astronomical instruments, from 1773 he began constant astronomical observations, which were recorded in the observation journals, and created a constellation Taurus Poniatovii. In 1781, Jean-Emmanuel Gilibert established the Botanical Garden of Vilnius University with over 2000 plants, he also provided the first herbariums, collections of stuffed animals and birds, fossil plants, animal remains, and a collection of minerals to the Vilnius University. After the Third Partition of the Commonwealth, the observatory published the first exact sciences journal in the Russian Empire called the Journal of Mathematical Sciences.

Sunrise Valley Science and Technology Park is a non-profit organization, founded in 2003. The park is the centre of entrepreneurship, promotion of business and science collaboration, provision of infrastructure and other innovation support. Over 20,000 students study in the Vilnius University and Vilnius Gediminas Technical University facilities in the Sunrise Valley and 5,000 scientists performs their research in the corresponding science centres there.

Centre for Physical Sciences and Technology or FTMC is the largest scientific research institution in Lithuania, which specialises in laser technologies, optoelectronics, nuclear physics, organic chemistry, bio and nano technologies, electrochemical material science, electronics, and other scientific fields. The centre was created in 2010 by merging institutes of Chemistry, Physics, Semiconductor Physics in Vilnius and Textile institute in Kaunas. The centre features 250 laboratories (24 open to the public) and can accommodate more than 700 researchers and students. Furthermore, the centre also offers PhD Studies and annually helds FizTech conferences of PhD students and young researchers. FTMC is the founder and sole shareholder of the Science and Technology Park of Institute of Physics in Savanorių Avenue, which provides assistance to companies operating in research and development field.

Laser Research Centre of Vilnius University is one of five departments in the Faculty of Physics, which prepares highly qualified physicists, laser physicists and laser technology specialists. The department carries out world-class research in laser physics, nonlinear optics, optical component characterization, biophotonics and laser microtechnology. Lithuania is one of the world's leaders in producing laser technologies and has over 50% of the world's market share in ultrashort pulses lasers, which are produced by the Vilnius-based companies. In 2019, they developed one of the world's most powerful laser system in the world SYLOS for the Extreme Light Infrastructure laboratory in Szeged, which produces high-intensity ultra-short pulses with a peak power of up to a thousand times that of the most powerful nuclear power plant in the United States. Also, Corning Inc. has bought the licence for the state-of-the-art glass cutting solutions from the Vilnius-based laser company Altechna and uses it for manufacturing billions of Gorilla Glasses.

Vilnius University Life Sciences Centre is a scientific research centre, which consists of three institutes: Institute of Biochemistry, Institute of Biosciences and Institute of Biotechnology. The centre was opened in 2016 and has 800 students, 120 PhD students and 200 scientific-pedagogical staff that are able to use open access scientific laboratories equipped with the most advanced equipment there. Next to the main building there is a Technology Business Incubator for small and medium businesses in life sciences or related fields.

Vilnius Gediminas Technical University has three research centres in the Sunrise Valley: Civil Engineering Research Centre, Technology Centre for Building Information and Digital Modelling, Competence Centre of Intermodal Transport and Logistics.

The Lithuanian Centre for Social Sciences in A. Goštauto St. 9 creates and disseminates high-level scientific knowledge in the fields of economics, sociology and law in order to implement public policy solutions and innovations based on them, strengthening the cohesion of science, business and society. The Centre closely cooperates with the Government of Lithuania.

Santara Valley is a second science and research valley in Vilnius, which focuses on the medicine, biopharmaceutical and bioinformatics areas. Vilnius University Faculty of Medicine Science Centre, costing  million, will be completed in the valley in 2021.

Jonas Kubilius, long-term rector of the Vilnius University is known for works in Probabilistic number theory, Kubilius model, Theorem of Kubilius and Turán–Kubilius inequality bear his name. Jonas Kubilius successfully resisted attempts to Russify the Vilnius University. Vilnian Marija Gimbutas was the first to formulate the Kurgan hypothesis. In 1963, Vytautas Straižys and his coworkers created Vilnius photometric system that is used in astronomy. Kavli Prize laureate Virginijus Šikšnys is known for his discoveries in CRISPR field – invention of CRISPR-Cas9 gene editing.

Information technology

Lithuania and its capital Vilnius is an attractive place for foreign companies to open their offices. This is due to several main reasons – highly qualified employees and good infrastructure. Several high schools are preparing skilled specialists in Vilnius, most notably the Vilnius University Faculty of Mathematics and Informatics and Vilnius Gediminas Technical University Faculty of Fundamental Sciences. Sphere of the information technology is an attractive profession among the qualified professionals due to the high salaries in Vilnius (e.g. Lithuanian branch of Google, established in Vilnius, offers ~ monthly salary, which is one of the highest in Lithuania). In 2018, the annual output of the information technology sector in Lithuania was  billion, of which a large amount was created in Vilnius.

Vilnius Tech Park in Sapieha Park is the biggest information technology startup hub in the Baltic and Nordic countries and unites international startups, technology companies, accelerators, incubators. In 2019, the fDi Intelligence (an investment experts subdivision of the Financial Times) ranked Vilnius as number one city in the Tech Start-up FDI Attraction Index.

In 2011, Vilnius had the fastest internet speed in the world and despite the fall in the rankings in recent years – it still remained as one of the fastest around the globe. Vilnius Airport also has one of the fastest wireless public internet (Wi-Fi) among the European airports.

The National Cyber Security Centre of Lithuania was established in Vilnius due increasing internet attacks against the Lithuanian Government organizations.

Bebras is an international informatics and information technology contest, which is held annually for pupils of 3–12 grades since 2004. Since 2017, computer programming is taught in the primary schools.

Lithuania and especially its capital Vilnius is a popular fintech companies hub due to the state's flexible regulations in the e-money licences field. In 2018, Bank of Lithuania granted an electronic money licence to the Google Payment Lithuania company, based in Vilnius. Since 2018, prominent e-money startup Revolut also has an e-money licence and headquarters in Vilnius, furthermore in 2019 it began to move its clients to the Lithuanian company Revolut Payments. On 23 January 2019, the Europe's first international Blockchain Centre was opened in Vilnius.

Finance and banking

Vilnius is Lithuania's financial centre. The Ministry of Finance is located in Vilnius and is responsible for the development and enforcement of an efficient public financial policy with a view to ensuring the macroeconomic stability of the state and its economic growth. The Bank of Lithuania is also headquartered in Vilnius and fosters a reliable financial system and ensures sustainable economic growth. Nasdaq Vilnius Stock Exchange, a leading stock exchange in Lithuania, is located in K29 business centre in Konstitucijos Avenue.

The National Audit Office of Lithuania is located in V. Kudirka Street and helps the state to manage public funds and property wisely. While the State Tax Inspectorate is headquartered in Vasario 16-osios Street and is responsible for collecting or refunding taxes in the country.

At the time, 7 banks in Lithuania are holding a bank or a specialised bank licence, while 9 banks are carrying out their activities as foreign bank branches. The two largest banks registered in Lithuania (AB SEB bankas, Swedbank, AB,) are supervised directly by the European Central Bank jointly with Bank of Lithuania experts.

The majority of the Lithuanian financial system consists of capital banks of the Nordic countries.

Education

Tertiary education

On 14 October 1773, the Commission of National Education was created by the Sejm of the Polish–Lithuanian Commonwealth and the Grand Duke Stanisław August Poniatowski, which supervised the Vilnius University, schools and was responsible for other educational matters in the Commonwealth. Because of its vast authority and autonomy, it is considered as the first Ministry of Education in European history and an important achievement of the Enlightenment in the Commonwealth.

The city has many universities. The largest and oldest is Vilnius University with 24,716 students. Its main premises are in the Old Town. The university has been ranked among the top 500 universities in the world by QS World University Rankings. The university is participating in projects with UNESCO and NATO, among others. It features Masters programs in English and Russian, as well as programs delivered in cooperation with universities all over Europe. The university is divided into 14 faculties.

Other major universities include Mykolas Romeris University (7,500 students), Vilnius Gediminas Technical University (9,600 students), and Lithuanian University of Educational Sciences (merged into Vytautas Magnus University in 2018). Specialized higher schools with university status include the General Jonas Žemaitis Military Academy of Lithuania, the Lithuanian Academy of Music and Theatre and the Vilnius Academy of Arts. The museum associated with the Vilnius Academy of Arts holds about 12,000 artworks.

There are also a few private universities such as ISM University of Management and Economics, European Humanities University, and Kazimieras Simonavičius University.

Several colleges are also in Vilnius including Vilnius College, Vilnius College of Technologies and Design, International School of Law and Business, and others.

Primary and secondary education

Primary and lower secondary education is mandatory in Lithuania. Children must start attending pre-primary education at six years old and education is compulsory until the age of 16. Primary and secondary education is free at all stages, however there also are private schools with tuition fees in Vilnius. The education system is governed by the Government of Lithuania and the Ministry of Education, Science and Sports of Lithuania which headquarters are in Vilnius.

Cathedral School of Vilnius, first mentioned in 1397, is the earliest known Lithuanian school. Vilnius Vytautas the Great Gymnasium, established in 1915, is the first Lithuanian gymnasium in Eastern Lithuania. In 2018, the city had 120 schools (not including preschools) with 61,123 pupils and 4,955 educators. Four out of five best rated schools in Lithuania are located in Vilnius, while the Vilnius Lyceum is the number one.

Ethnic minorities in Lithuania are allowed to have their own schools. In Vilnius there are 7 elementary schools, 8 primary schools, 2 progymnasiums and 12 gymnasiums dedicated exceptionally for minorities children where lessons are conducted in minorities languages only. In 2017, there were 4,658 Poles and 9,274 Russians who studied in their minorities languages in the city.

Vilnius has 11 vocational schools which provides vocational education.

National M. K. Čiurlionis School of Art is the only art school in Lithuania spanning the entire 12-year learning cycle. Vilnius Justinas Vienožinskis Art School is another prominent art school in Vilnius.

Most of the school graduates in Vilnius later studies in the universities or colleges as Lithuania is one of the world's leading countries in OECD's statistics of population with tertiary education (56% of 25–34 year-olds in 2018).

Vilnius has 9 international schools: International School of Vilnius, Vilnius International French Lyceum, British International School of Vilnius, American International School of Vilnius, etc.

Libraries

The Central Library of Vilnius City Municipality operates public libraries in Vilnius. It has 16 public libraries, located in different elderships of Vilnius, one of them (Saulutė) is dedicated to children's literature only. Large part of these libraries organizes computer literacy courses that are free of charge. Usage of public libraries requires a free LIBIS (integrated information system of Lithuanian libraries) card.

Martynas Mažvydas National Library of Lithuania, located in Gediminas Avenue and founded in 1919, is a national cultural institution which collects, organizes and preserves Lithuania's written cultural heritage content, develops the collection of Lithuanian and foreign documents relevant to research, educational and cultural needs of Lithuania, and provides library information services to the public. As of 1 July 2019, its electronic catalog has 1,140,708 bibliographic records.

The Wroblewski Library of the Lithuanian Academy of Sciences is a scientific library of state significance, a cultural, scientific and educational institution. Its founder is the Lithuanian Academy of Sciences. All citizens of Lithuania and foreign countries are entitled to use the services of the Library. As of 1 January 2015, the stock of the Library counted 3,733,514 volumes. On 1 January 2015, the Wroblewski Library of the Lithuanian Academy of Sciences had 12,274 registered users.

Every Lithuanian university and college has its own library, dedicated to their students, professors and alumni. Central Vilnius University Library, Vilnius Gediminas Technical University Library, Mykolas Romeris University Library, ISM University of Management and Economics Library, European Humanities University Library, Kazimieras Simonavičius University Library are located in these universities complexes in Vilnius.

Religion

Already in the 17th century Vilnius was known as a city of many religions. In 1600, Samuel Lewkenor's book describing cities with universities was published in London. Lewkenor mentions that citizens of Vilnius included Catholics, Orthodox, followers of John Calvin and Martin Luther, Jews and Tartar Muslims.

Throughout the 17th century Vilnius had a reputation as a city which had no rivals in Europe in the number of churches of different confessions. At the end of the century, this reputation was confirmed by the highly regarded (and several times republished) work by Robert Morden, "Geography Rectified or a Description of the World", which said that no other city in the world could surpass Vilnius in the number of churches and temples of various faiths, except perhaps Amsterdam.

Today Vilnius is the seat of the Roman Catholic Archdiocese of Vilnius, with the main church institutions and Archdiocesan Cathedral (Vilnius Cathedral) located here. Numerous Christian Beatified persons, martyrs, Servants of God and Saints, are associated with Vilnius. These, among others, include Franciscan martyrs of Vilnius, Orthodox martyrs Anthony, John, and Eustathius, Saint Casimir, Josaphat Kuntsevych, Andrew Bobola, Raphael Kalinowski, Faustina Kowalska, Jurgis Matulaitis-Matulevičius.

There are a number of other active Roman Catholic churches in the city, along with small enclosed monasteries and religion schools. Church architecture includes Gothic, Renaissance, Baroque and Neoclassical styles, with important examples of each found in the Old Town. Additionally, Eastern Rite Catholicism has maintained a presence in Vilnius since the Union of Brest. The Baroque Basilian Gate is part of an Eastern Rite monastery.

Vilnius has been home to an Eastern Orthodox Christian presence since the 13th or even the 12th century. A famous Russian Orthodox Monastery of the Holy Spirit, is near the [Gate of Dawn. St. Paraskeva's Orthodox Church in the Old Town is the site of the baptism of Hannibal, the great-grandfather of Pushkin, by Tsar Peter the Great in 1705. Many Old Believers, who split from the Russian Orthodox Church in 1667, settled in Lithuania. The Church of St. Michael and St. Constantine was built in 1913. Today a Supreme Council of the Old Believers is based in Vilnius.

A number of Protestant and other Christian groups are represented in Vilnius, most notably the Lutheran Evangelicals and the Baptists.

The pre-Christian religion of Lithuania, centred on the forces of nature as personified by deities such as Perkūnas (the Thunder God), is experiencing some increased interest. Romuva established a Vilnius branch in 1991.

Judaism and Karaism

Once widely known as Yerushalayim D'Lita (the "Jerusalem of Lithuania"), Vilnius, since the 18th century, was a world centre for Torah study, and had a large Jewish population. A major scholar of Judaism and Kabbalah centred in Vilnius was the famous Rabbi Eliyahu Kremer, also known as the Vilna Gaon. His writings have significant influence among Orthodox Jews to this day. The Vilna Shas, the most widely used edition of the Talmud was published in Vilnius in 1886. Jewish life in Vilnius was destroyed during the Holocaust; there is a memorial stone dedicated to victims of Nazi genocide in the centre of the former Jewish Ghetto – now Mėsinių Street. The Vilna Gaon Jewish State Museum is dedicated to the history of Lithuanian Jewish life. The site of Vilnius's largest synagogue, built in the early 1630s and wrecked by Nazi Germany during its occupation of Lithuania, was found by ground-penetrating radar in June 2015, with excavations set to begin in 2016.

The Karaites are a Jewish sect that migrated to Lithuania from the Crimea. Although their numbers are very small, the Karaites are becoming more prominent since Lithuanian independence, and have restored their kenesas (e.g. the ).

Pilgrimage

Since the Christianization of Lithuania in 1387, Vilnius has become one of the main centres of Christianity in Lithuania and a Christian pilgrimage site. Vilnius Pilgrimage Centre coordinates pilgrimages, assists in their proper preparation, and takes care of pilgrimage pastoral care. Many places in Vilnius are associated with divine miracles or marks significant events to the Christians. The Chapel of the Gate of Dawn is visited by thousands of Christian pilgrims annually. Initially, the gates were part of the defensive Wall of Vilnius, however in the 16th century they were given to the Carmelites, who installed a chapel in the gates with a prominent 17th century Catholic painting Our Lady of the Gate of Dawn. The painting was later decorated with gold-plated silver embellishments and is surrounded by a legend and divine miracles.

Sanctuary of the Divine Mercy is another important pilgrimage site, which has the Divine Mercy image. Vilnius became the birthplace of the Divine Mercy Devotion when Saint Faustina began her mission under the guidance and discernment of her new spiritual director, blessed Michał Sopoćko. In 1934, the first Divine Mercy image was painted by Eugeniusz Kazimirowski under the supervision of Faustina Kowalska and it presently hangs in the Divine Mercy Sanctuary in Vilnius. A feast of the Adoration of the Blessed Sacrament is held in the shrine 24 hours per day. The House of St. Faustina where she previously lived is located in V. Grybo St. in Antakalnis and is open to the pilgrims every day.

Church of St. Philip and St. Jacob near the Lukiškės Square has the painting of the Mother of God of Lukiškės, which is glorified by divine miracles. The icon was painted in the 15th – 16th centuries and is one of the oldest monuments of easel painting in Lithuania. It was brought by the Grand Duchy of Lithuania artillery general Motiejus Korvinas Gosievskis from the Russo-Polish War. From 1684 onwards miracles began to be experienced in the Vilnius Dominican Monastery, related to the image of Mother of God of Lukiškės, which in 1737 were published in a miracles book Mystical fountain. The icon was restored and returned to the Dominicans in 2012.

Three Crosses is a prominent monument in Vilnius. According to a debated legend of the Franciscan martyrs of Vilnius, presented in the Bychowiec Chronicle, fourteen Franciscan friars were invited to Vilnius from Podolia by Petras Goštautas. The friars publicly preached the gospel and denigrated the pagan Lithuanian gods. Angered city residents burned the monastery and killed all fourteen friars. Seven of them were beheaded on the Bleak Hill; the other seven were crucified and thrown into the Neris or Vilnia River.

Verkiai Calvary (or Vilnius Calvary) is the second oldest calvary in Lithuania after Žemaičių Kalvarija. It is located in Verkiai, a neighborhood of Vilnius. The Calvary was built in 1662–69 as a sign of gratitude for the victory in the Second Northern War (1655–60). The consecration ceremony of the new Stations of the Cross took place at Pentecost on 9 June 1669. The Calvary includes 20 brick chapels, seven wooden and one brick gate, and one bridge with a wooden chapel. The path ends at the Church of the Discovery of the Holy Cross. In 1962 all chapels, except four closest to the church, were destroyed by the Soviet authorities with dynamites overnight. The Calvary was reconstructed in 1990–2002 and the chapels were solemnly consecrated at Pentecost in 2002. Pilgrimages in the Calvary are organized regularly with the clergy.

Church Heritage Museum exhibits the oldest and largest of all the churches of the Grand Duchy of Lithuania treasure trove of the Vilnius Cathedral and liturgical artefacts from other churches of the Roman Catholic Archdiocese of Vilnius.

Vilnius is the only city in the Baltic states with an Apostolic Nunciature, in which Pope John Paul II and Pope Francis stayed during their visits to Lithuania, Latvia and Estonia.

Parks, squares and cemeteries

Almost half of Vilnius is covered by green areas, such as parks, public gardens, natural reserves.
Additionally, Vilnius is host to numerous lakes, where residents and visitors swim and have barbecues in the summer. Thirty lakes and 16 rivers cover 2.1% of Vilnius's area, with some of them having sand beaches.

Vingis Park, the city's largest, hosted several major rallies during Lithuania's drive towards independence in the 1980s. Sections of the annual Vilnius Marathon pass along the public walkways on the banks of the Neris River. The green area next to the White Bridge is another popular area to enjoy good weather, and has become venue for several music and large screen events.

Cathedral Square in Old Town is surrounded by a number of the city's most historically significant sites. Lukiškės Square is the largest, bordered by several governmental buildings: the Lithuanian Ministry of Foreign Affairs, the Ministry of Finance, the Polish Embassy, and the Genocide Victims' Museum, where the KGB tortured and murdered numerous opposers of the communist regime. An oversized statue of Lenin in its centre was removed in 1991. Town Hall Square has long been a centre of trade fairs, celebrations, and events in Vilnius, including the Kaziukas Fair. The city Christmas tree is decorated there. State ceremonies are often held in Daukanto Square, facing the Presidential Palace.

On 20 October 2013, Bernardinai Garden, near Gediminas Tower, previously known as Sereikiškės Park, was opened after reconstruction. The authentic 19th century Vladislovas Štrausas environment was restored. It is a venue for concerts, festivals, and exhibitions.

Rasos Cemetery, consecrated in 1801, is the burial site of Jonas Basanavičius and other signatories of the 1918 Act of Independence, along with the heart of Polish leader Józef Piłsudski. Two of the three Jewish cemeteries in Vilnius were destroyed by communist authorities during the Soviet era; the remains of the Vilna Gaon were moved to the remaining one. A monument was erected at the place where Užupis Old Jewish Cemetery was. About 18,000 burials have been made in the Bernardine Cemetery, established in 1810; it was closed during the 1970s and is now being restored. Antakalnis Cemetery, established in 1809, contains various memorials to Polish, Lithuanian, German and Russian soldiers, along with the graves of those who were killed during the January Events.

Tourism

According to the data collected by the Lithuanian Department of Statistics, a total of 1,200,858 visitors had rented rooms in Vilnius accommodation venues where they spent a total of 2,212,109 nights in 2018. Compared to the 2017 statistics, the number of guests grew by 12% and 11% respectively.

In 2018 81% of all the visitors who stayed in Vilnius were foreigners (970,577), which is 11% more than the previous year. Most foreign visitors came from Belarus (102,915), Germany (101,999), Poland (99,386), Russia (90,388) and Latvia (61,829). Guests from these countries accounted for 47% of all foreign guests, who rented rooms in Vilnius accommodation venues. Entirely, 230,281 Lithuanians (19% of all guests) were in Vilnius accommodation venues during 2018 (which is 18% more than in 2017).

According to a 2018 Vilnius Visitors Survey, 48% of tourists visited Vilnius for the first time, 85% of tourists planned the trip by themselves and 15% travelled with travel agencies. According to the same survey, 40% of tourists specified that they decided to visit Vilnius in order to learn about the history and heritage of the city; however, 23% of tourists also planned trips to other areas of Lithuania (e.g. Trakai, Kaunas, Druskininkai, Šiauliai, etc.). Many Belarusians (around 200,000 granted travel visas annually) are arriving for shopping in the city's shopping malls and upon departing submits even half a meter long receipts to the customs.

In 2018 Vilnius Tourist Information Centres were visited by a total of 119,136 visitors (95,932 foreigners and 23,204 Lithuanians), a 5% increase compared with the 2017 statistics. In 2017 the centres were visited by 113,818 visitors (97,072 foreigners and 16,746 Lithuanians).

The best-rated tourist services in Vilnius are restaurants (cafés) services quality, old town attractions, hotels (or other accommodation places) services, trips to Trakai, parks (green zones), connection with the Vilnius Airport, food in hotels, restaurants, cafés.

In the City Costs Barometer 2019, Vilnius was ranked as number one among the European capitals for offering best value to visitors.

The Vilnius Palace of Concerts and Sports, originally constructed by the Soviet authorities on the site of a Jewish graveyard, is slated in 2022 to be transformed into the leading convention center in the Baltic states. The project is controversial.

Hotels

Lithuania is a member of the European Hotelstars Union, which provides a harmonised hotel classification with common criteria and procedures in the participating countries. Vilnius has six 5-star hotels, all located in the Vilnius Old Town. There are also 27 4-star hotels. The Grand Hotel Kempinski Vilnius, with a direct view of the Cathedral Square, is considered as the most luxurious hotel in Vilnius and offers presidential rooms for around €3,000 per night (more than three times the average monthly net salary in Vilnius) and is frequently chosen by the heads of state, movie stars, famous musicians and other celebrities during their visits to Lithuania.

In 2019, Vilnius had 82 hotels, 8 motels and 40 other accommodation facilities with 6,822 rooms and 15,248 beds. The highest hotel room occupancy was in August and the lowest in February.

According to a 2018 Vilnius visitors survey, 44% of visitors to Vilnius stayed in middle-range hotels (3–4 stars), 12% stayed in standard or economy hotels (1–2 stars) and 11% stayed in luxury 5-star hotels.

Sports

Several basketball teams are based in the city: newly created BC Wolves, which will start to compete in the 2022–23 Lithuanian Basketball League season and the largest one is BC Rytas, which participates in the international the Basketball Champions League and the domestic Lithuanian Basketball League, winning the ULEB Cup (predecessor to the EuroCup) in 2005 and the EuroCup in 2009. Its home arena is the 2,500-seat Lietuvos Rytas Arena; all European matches and important domestic matches are played in the 10,000-seat Avia Solutions Group Arena.

Vilnius also has several football teams. FK Žalgiris is the main football team. The club plays at LFF Stadium in Vilnius (capacity 5,067). Construction of the multi-functional Lithuania National Stadium has been ongoing in Šeškinė since 1987.

, the newly expanded SEB Arena, holding 28 tennis courts, is the largest tennis complex in Central Europe and home of the Lithuanian tennis and squash teams. It's also the venue for the Vilnius Open tennis tournament, part of the ATP Challenger Tour.

Olympic champions in swimming Lina Kačiušytė and Robertas Žulpa are from Vilnius. There are several public swimming pools in Vilnius with Lazdynai Swimming Pool being the only Olympic-size swimming pool of the city.

The city is home to the Lithuanian Bandy Association, Badminton Federation, Canoeing Sports Federation, Baseball Association, Biathlon Federation, Sailors Union, Football Federation, Fencing Federation, Cycling Sports Federation, Archery Federation, Athletics Federation, Ice Hockey Federation, Basketball Federation, Curling Federation, Rowing Federation, Wrestling Federation, Speed Skating Association, Gymnastics Federation, Equestrian Union, Modern Pentathlon Federation, Shooting Union, Triathlon Federation, Volleyball Federation, Tennis Union, Taekwondo Federation, Weightlifting Federation, Table Tennis Association, Skiing Association, Rugby Federation, Swimming Federation.

The Vilnius Marathon is an international marathon with thousands of participants every year.

Vilnius was one of the host cities for the 2021 FIFA Futsal World Cup.

Transport

Navigability of the river Neris is very limited and no regular water routes exist, although it was used for navigation in the past. The river rises in Belarus, connecting Vilnius and Kernavė, and becomes a tributary of Nemunas river in Kaunas.

Vilnius Airport serves most Lithuanian international flights to many major European destinations. The airport has about 50 destinations in 25 countries.

The Vilnius railway station is an important hub serving direct passenger connections to Minsk, Kaliningrad, Moscow and Saint Petersburg as well as being a transit point of Pan-European Corridor IX.

Vilnius is the starting point of the A1 motorway that runs across Lithuania and connects the three major cities (Vilnius, Kaunas and Klaipėda) and is a part of European route E85. The A2 motorway, connecting Vilnius with Panevėžys, is a part of E272. Other highways starting in Vilnius include A3, A4, A14, A15, A16. Vilnius's Southern bypass is road A19.

Public transport

The bus network and the trolleybus network are run by Vilniaus viešasis transportas. There are over 60 bus, 18 trolleybus, 6 rapid bus and 6 night bus routes. The trolleybus network is one of the most extensive in Europe. Over 250 buses and 260 trolleybuses transport about 500,000 passengers every workday. The first regular bus routes were established in 1926, and the first trolleybuses were introduced in 1956.

At the end of 2007, a new electronic monthly ticket system was introduced. It was possible to buy an electronic card in shops and newspaper stands and have it credited with an appropriate amount of money. The monthly e-ticket cards could be bought once and credited with an appropriate amount of money in various ways including the Internet. Previous paper monthly tickets were in use until August 2008.

The ticket system changed again from 15 August 2012. E-Cards were replaced by Vilnius Citizen Cards ("Vilniečio Kortelė"). It is now possible to buy a card or change an old one in newspaper stands and have it credited with an appropriate amount of money or a particular type of ticket. Single trip tickets have been replaced by 30 and 60-minute tickets.

The public transportation system is dominated by the low-floor Volvo and Mercedes-Benz buses as well as Solaris trolleybuses. There are also plenty of the traditional Škoda vehicles, built in the Czech Republic, still in service, and many of these have been extensively refurbished internally. This is a result of major improvements that started in 2003 when the first brand-new Mercedes-Benz buses were bought. In 2004, a contract was signed with Volvo Buses to buy 90 brand-new 7700 buses over the following three years.

An electric tram and a metro system through the city were proposed in the 2000s. However, neither has progressed beyond initial planning. In 2018 the Seimas of the Republic of Lithuania approved a new metro project with the president's agreement.

In 2014 a mobile app was launched with public transport tickets on smartphones.

In 2017, Vilnius started the historically largest upgrade of its bus services by purchasing 250 new low-floor buses. The project resulted in making 6 of 10 public buses being brand new by the middle of 2018 and allowed its passengers to use such modern technologies as free Wi-Fi and to charge their electronic devices while traveling. On 5 September 2017, 50 new Isuzu buses were presented and articulated Scania buses were promised in the very near future. Vilnius City Municipality also held a contest for 41 new trolleybuses and its winner Solaris committed to deliver all trolleybuses until the autumn of 2018, which also have the free Wi-Fi and charging features. On 13 November Vilnius City Municipality signed a contract with Solaris for the remaining 150 Solaris Urbino buses of the newest IV generation (100 standard and 50 articulated), also with the free Wi-Fi and USB charging. On 20 September 2019, five all-electric Karsan Jest Electric autobuses were presented, which serve the 89 route in narrow streets.

Since 2017 a 30-minute ticket costs 0.65 euro, a 60-minute ticket costs 0.90 euro and a single ticket bought on board costs 1.00 euro. There are other types of tickets, both short-term and long-term. Various discounts for pupils, students and elder people are available.

Healthcare

The Vilnians took care of the cleanliness and health responsibly already during the Grand Duchy of Lithuania times as the city had public bathhouses and one fourth of houses in Vilnius had individual bathhouses, also almost half of the houses had alcohol distilleries. In 1518, medicine doctor and canon Martynas Dušnickis established the first špitolė in Vilnius, which was the first hospital-like institution in Lithuania and treated people who were not able to take care of themselves due to their health condition, age, and poverty.

The Brotherhood of Saint Roch maintained primitive hospitals and shelters (špitolė) for the sick and the disabled in Vilnius from 1708 to 1799, although it is not known whether the brothers had any kind of medical education, it is known that the brothers hired paramedics, doctors, and surgeons, including women nurses who could take care of their female patients, and a significant number of its patients had sexually transmitted diseases (other Catholic hospitals refused to treat such patients), also the brotherhood sheltered pregnant women and their abandoned children, other patients sought help for injuries, tuberculosis, rheumatism, arthritis, etc.

In 1805, the Vilnius Medical Society was established on the initiative of Joseph Frank (son of Johann Peter Frank), which was the first society of this type in Eastern Europe and to this day unites medicine doctors and professors in Vilnius. The same year, the society established a teaching hospital (clinic) under the Vilnius University Faculty of Medicine.

In 1918–1941, the Lithuanian Sanitary Aid Society operated in Vilnius.

The Ministry of Health is located in Vilnius and is responsible for the healthcare in Lithuania. Vilnians have to pay the compulsory health insurance (6.98% of the salary), which is governed by the Vilnius Territorial Health Insurance Fund and guarantees free health care to every insured person, however some residents are exempt from this tax (e.g. disabled persons, children, full-time students, etc.).

Vilnius University Hospital Santaros Klinikos and the Vilnius City Clinical Hospital are the primary hospitals in Vilnius. There also are eight polyclinics, the Medical Centre of the Ministry of the Interior and a number of private health care facilities in the city.

Media

The first Lithuanian periodical newspaper (weekly) Kurier Litewski was published in Vilnius from 1760 to 1763. Vilnius is home to numerous newspapers, magazines and publications including Lietuvos rytas, Lietuvos žinios, Verslo žinios, Respublika, Valstiečių laikraštis, Mokesčių žinios, Aktualijos, 15min, Vilniaus diena, Vilniaus Kraštas, Lietuvos aidas, Valstybė, Veidas, Panelė, Franciscan Bernardinai.lt, Russian Litovskij kurjer, Polish Tygodnik Wileńszczyzny.

Vilnius TV Tower is located in Karoliniškės microdistrict and transmits television signals to the whole of Vilnius. The most-viewed networks in Lithuania are headquartered in Vilnius including LRT televizija, TV3, LNK, BTV, LRT Plius, LRT Lituanica, TV6, Lietuvos rytas TV, TV1, TV8, Sport1, Liuks!, Info TV.

The first stationary radio station in Vilnius Rozgłośnia Wileńska was launched in Žvėrynas microdistrict on 28 November 1927, but was later moved to the present-day Gediminas Avenue in 1935. M-1, the first commercial radio station in Lithuania, started broadcasting from Vilnius in 1989. Many other Lithuanian or foreign languages radio stations also broadcasts from Vilnius, most of them signals comes from the Vilnius TV Tower or the Vilnius Press House.

The Lithuanian Union of Journalists and the Lithuanian Society of Journalists are headquartered in Vilnius.

Twin towns – sister cities

Vilnius is twinned with:

 Aalborg, Denmark
 Almaty, Kazakhstan
 Astana, Kazakhstan
 Chicago, United States
 Dnipro, Ukraine
 Donetsk, Ukraine
 Duisburg, Germany
 Erfurt, Germany
 Gdańsk, Poland (1998)
 Guangzhou, China
 Joensuu, Finland
 Kyiv, Ukraine
 Kraków, Poland
 Łódź, Poland
 Madison, United States
 Pavia, Italy
 Reykjavík, Iceland
 Riga, Latvia
 Salzburg, Austria
 Taipei, Taiwan
 Tallinn, Estonia
 Tbilisi, Georgia
 Warsaw, Poland

Former twin towns and friendly towns (until 2022):

 Irkutsk, Russia
 Kaliningrad, Russia
 Krasnoyarsk, Russia
 Minsk, Belarus
 Saint Petersburg, Russia
 Ulan-Ude, Russia
 Yaroslavl, Russia

Significant depictions in popular culture
Vilnius is mentioned in the movie The Hunt for Red October (1990) as being the boyhood home of the sub commander Marko Ramius, and as being where his grandfather taught him to fish; he is also referenced once in the movie as "The Vilnius Schoolmaster". Ramius is played by Sean Connery.
Author Thomas Harris's character Hannibal Lecter is revealed to be from Vilnius and its aristocracy in the movie Hannibal Rising. Lecter is portrayed more popularly and often by Sir Anthony Hopkins, although Brian Cox played Lecter in the movie Manhunter.
The memoir A Partisan from Vilna (2010) details the life and struggles of Rachel Margolis. Her family's sole survivor, she escaped from the Vilna Ghetto with other members of the resistance movement, the FPO (United Partisan Organization), and joined the Soviet partisans in the Lithuanian forests to sabotage the Nazis.
Vilnius is classified as a city-state in the turn-based strategy games Civilization V and "Civilization VI".
Vilnius is a province and a capital city in the grand strategy game Europa Universalis IV.
Vilnius is the capital of Lithuania in the turn-based strategy game Medieval II: Total War: Kingdoms and a rebels' town in the Medieval II: Total War game.
Historical drama War & Peace was filmed in Vilnius by the BBC.
A well rated five-part historical drama television miniseries about Chernobyl nuclear disaster was mostly filmed in two Soviet-era elderships of Vilnius: Justiniškės and Fabijoniškės.
HBO's miniseries Catherine the Great, featuring Helen Mirren, was filmed in multiple locations of Vilnius.
Part of the Season 4 of the television series Stranger Things was filmed in multiple locations of Vilnius, including the now empty Lukiškės Prison in 2020.
German TV series about Empress Elisabeth of Austria was partly filmed in Vilnius in 2021.

Notable people

See also

Coat of arms of Vilnius
List of monuments in Vilnius
List of Vilnius Elderships in other languages
Neighborhoods of Vilnius

References

Bibliography
References from vle.lt stands for the Visuotinė lietuvių enciklopedija.

External links

 
The Jerusalem of Lithuania: The Story of the Jewish Community of Vilna an online exhibition by Yad Vashem

A. Srebrakowski, The nationality panorama of Vilnius, Studia z Dziejów Rosji i Europy Środkowo-Wschodniej, Vol 55, No 3 (2020)

 
Capitals in Europe
Cities in Lithuania
Cities in Vilnius County
Capitals of Lithuanian counties
Historic Jewish communities
Holocaust locations in Lithuania
Magdeburg rights
Municipalities administrative centres of Lithuania
Vilna Governorate
Vilnius Voivodeship
Wilno Voivodeship (1926–1939)
Articles containing video clips
Jewish communities destroyed in the Holocaust